= Rundbogenstil =

Germanic architectural style

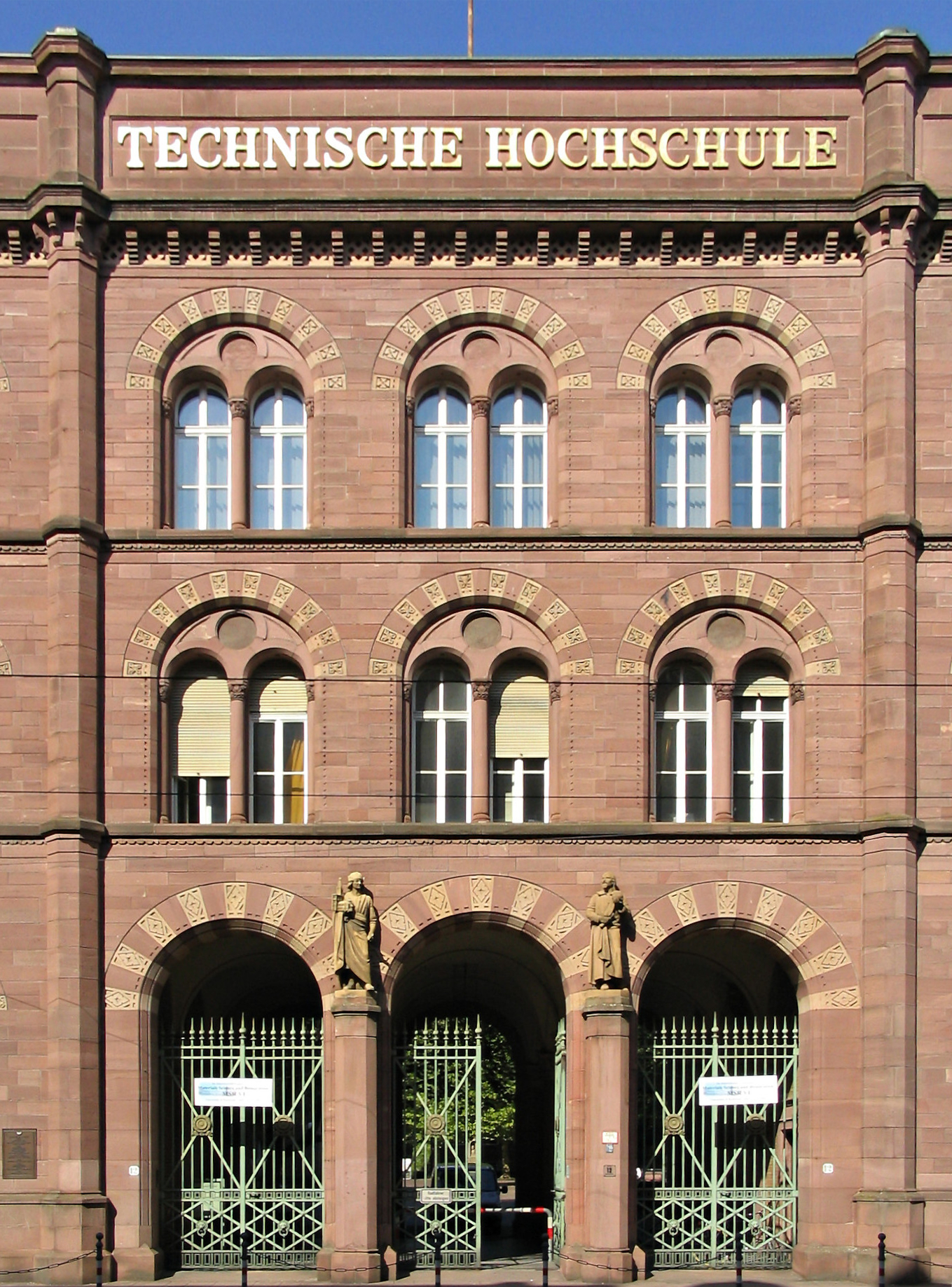
Entrance to the main building of Karlsruhe Polytechnic (Heinrich Hübsch, 1833–35)

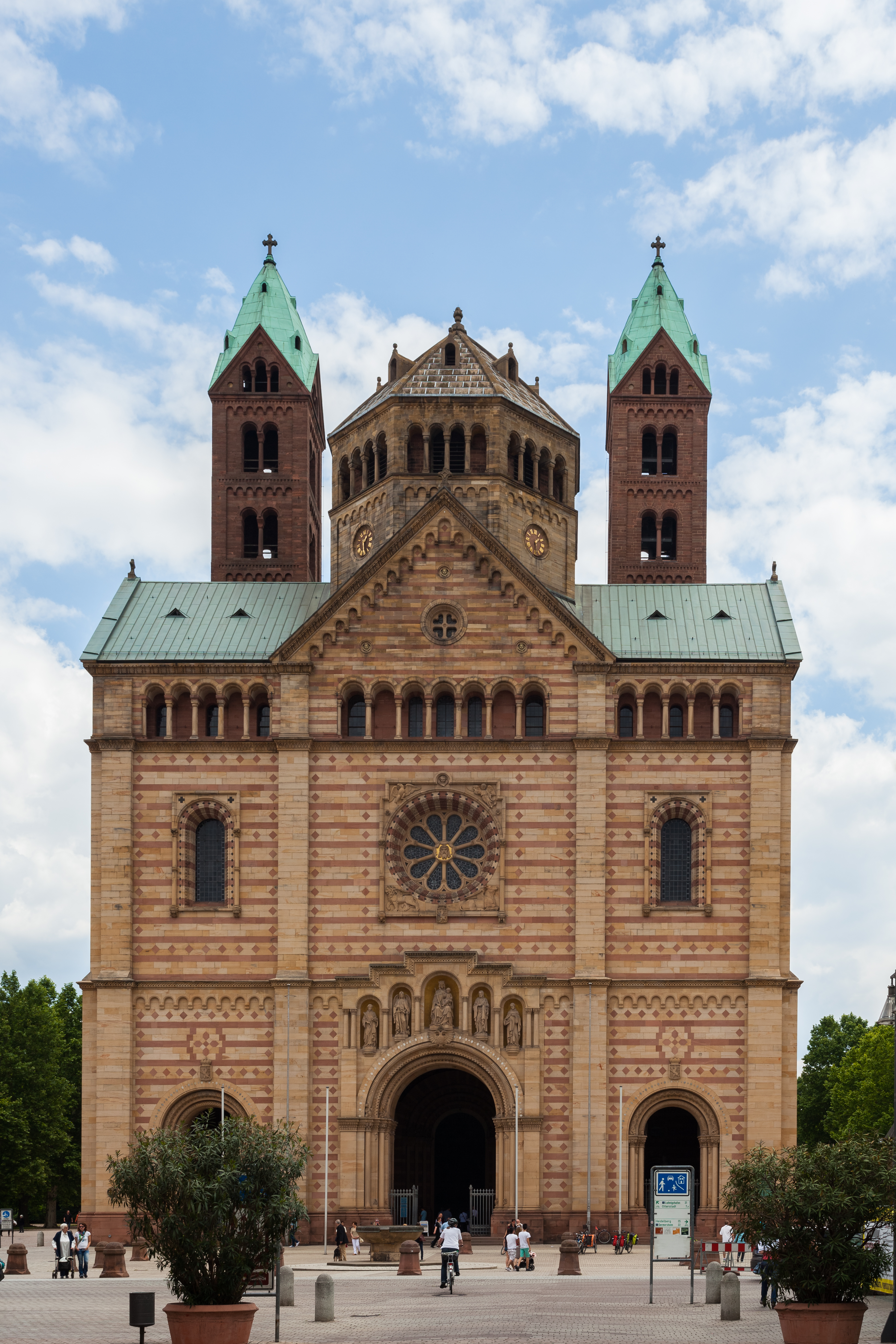
West facade of the Speyer Cathedral (1030–1061), rebuilt 1854–58 by Heinrich Hübsch

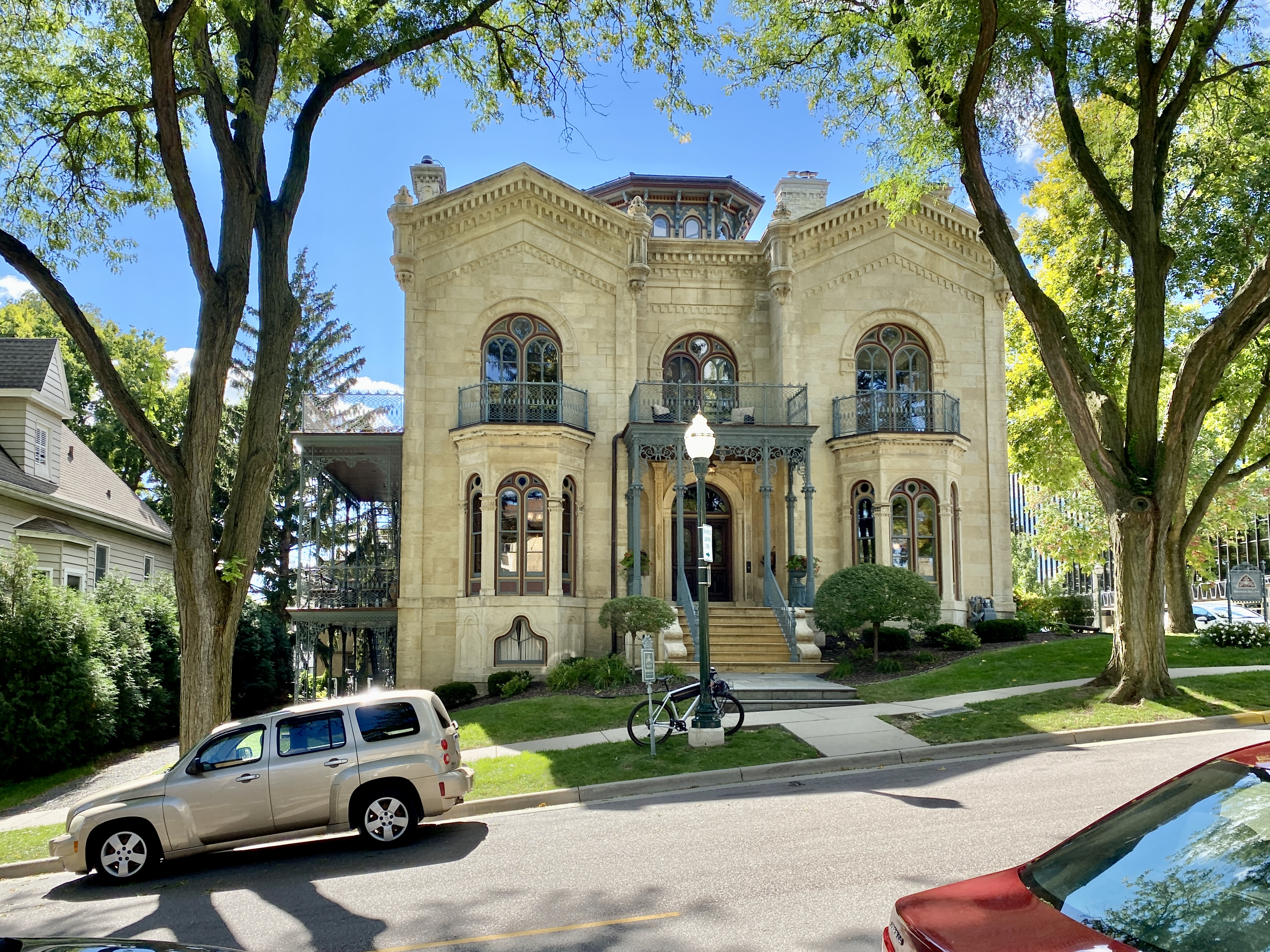
Carrie Pierce House in Madison, Wisconsin (August Kutzbock and Samuel Donnel, 1857)

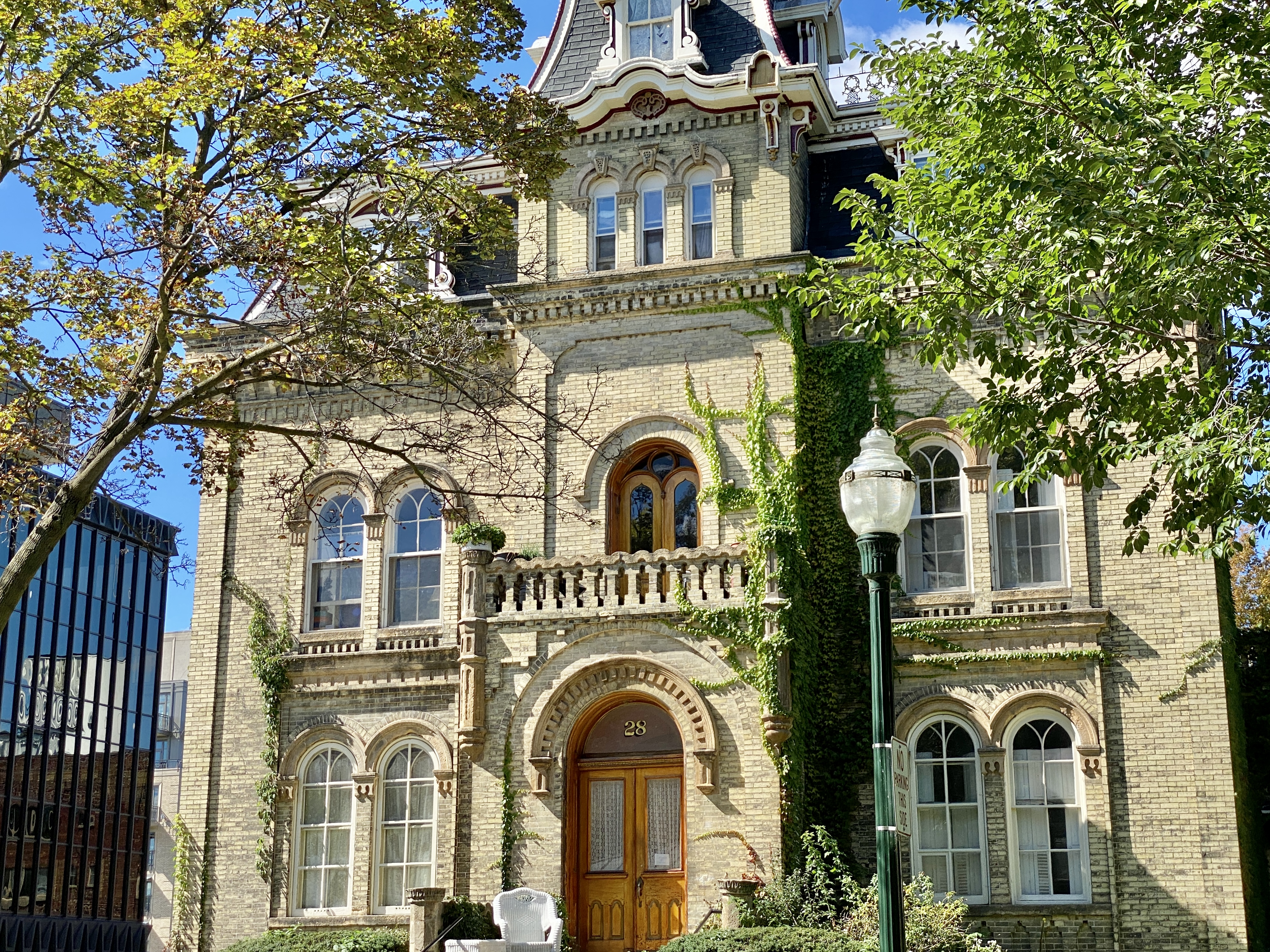
Van Slyke / Keenan House in Madison, Wisconsin (August Kutzbock, 1858)

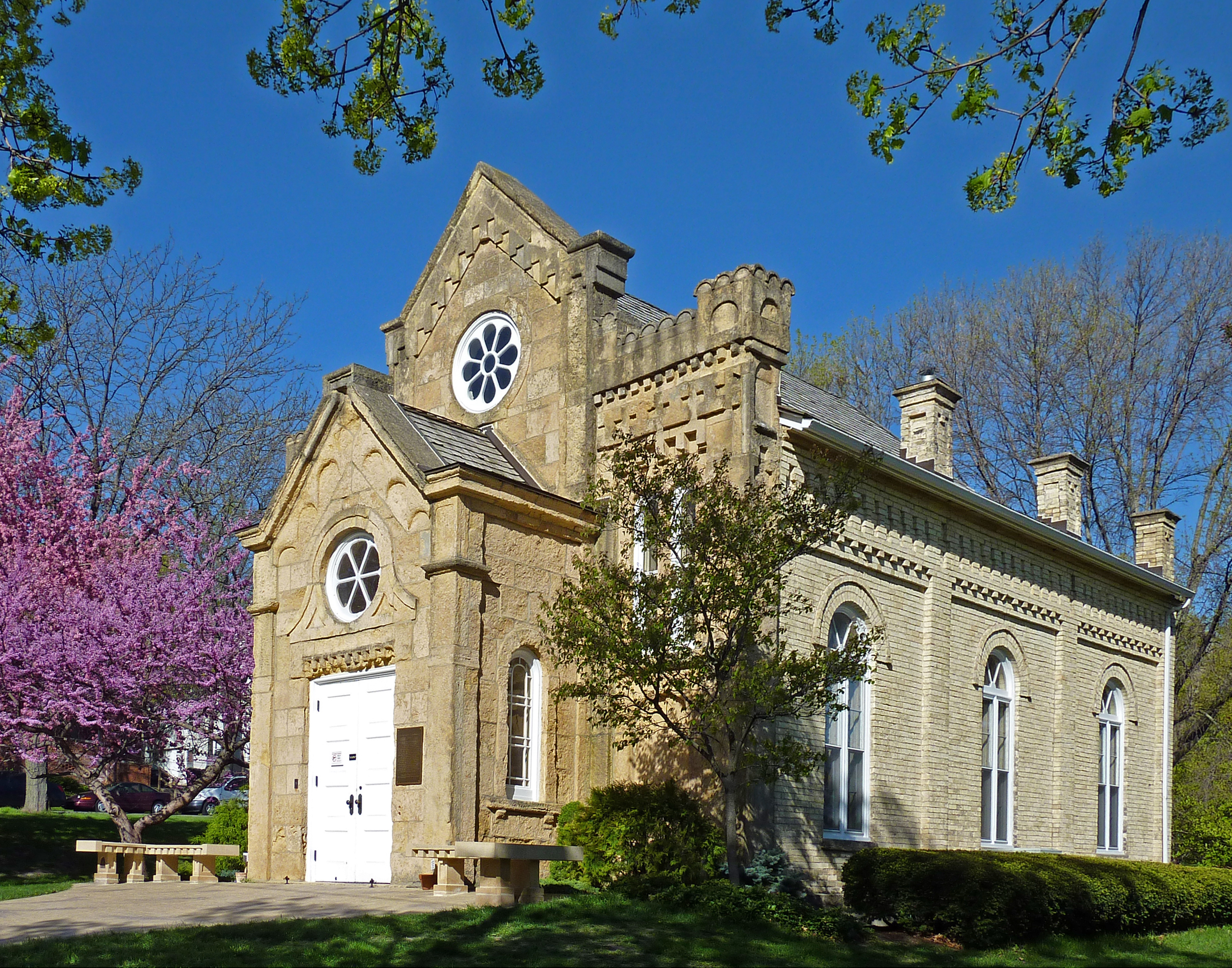
Gates of Heaven Synagogue in Madison, Wisconsin (August Kutzbock, 1863)

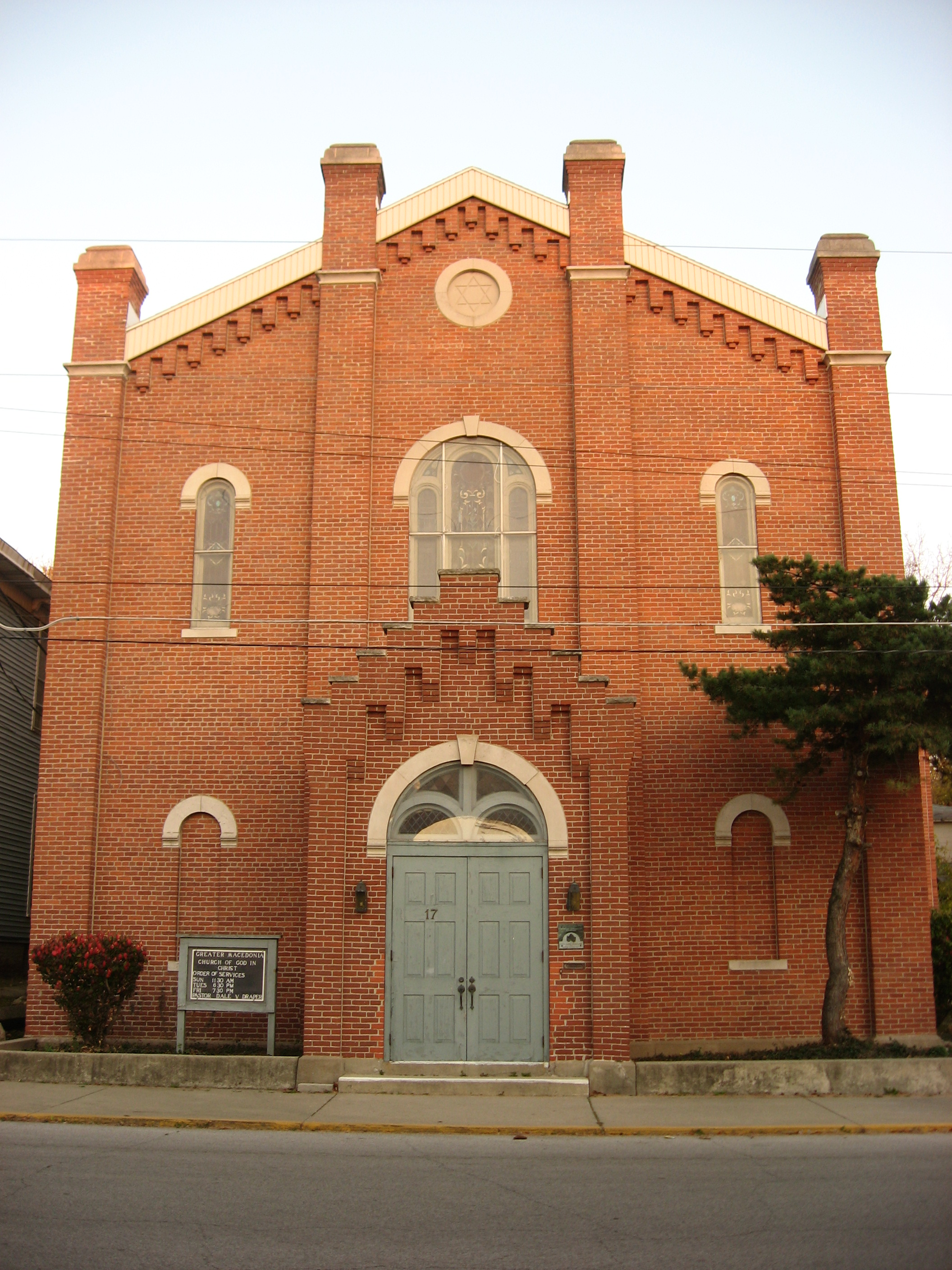
Temple Israel in Lafayette, Indiana (1867)

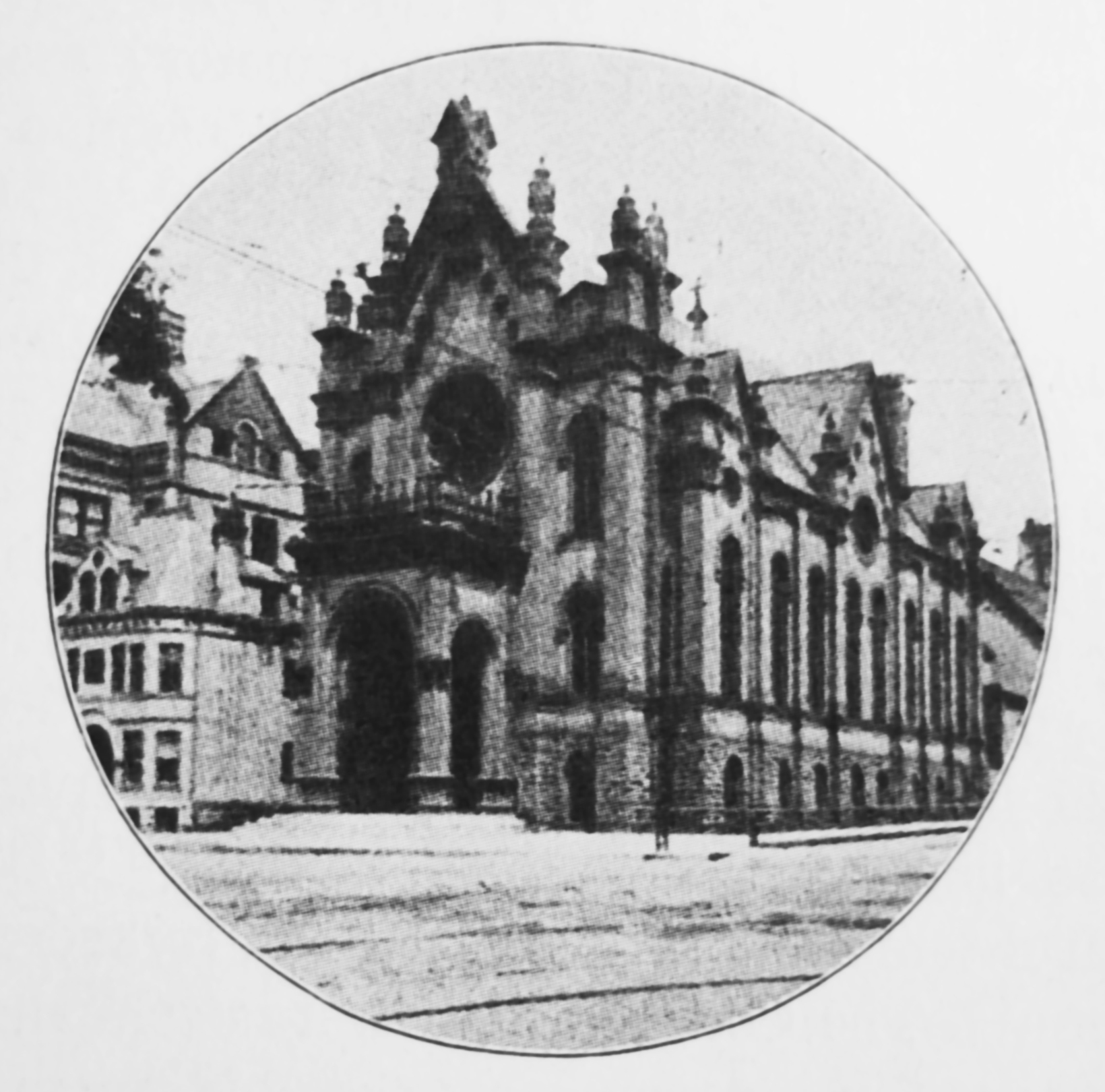
Temple Emanu-El in Milwaukee, Wisconsin (1872)

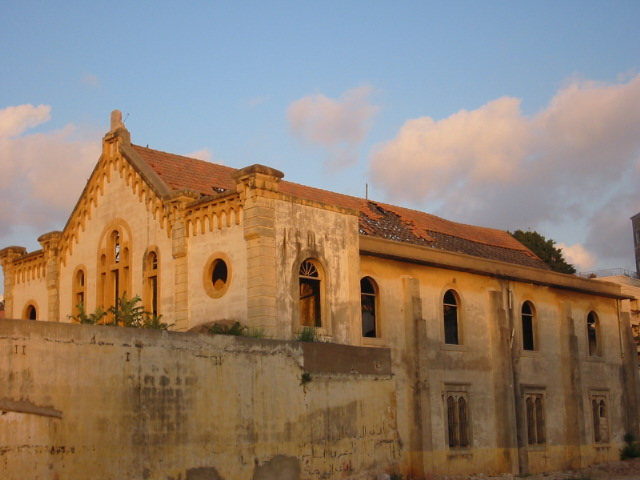
Maghen Abraham Synagogue in Beirut, Lebanon (1925)

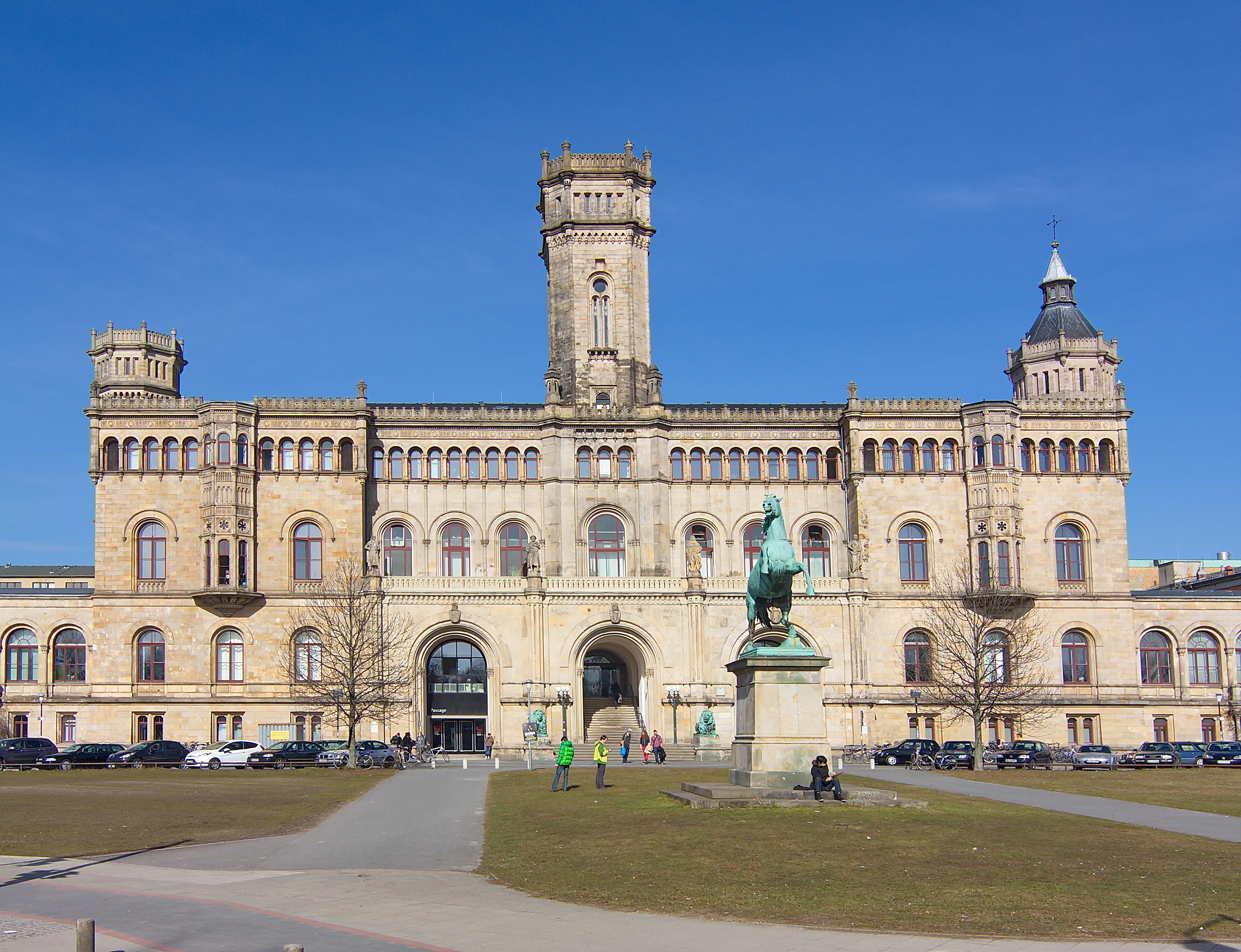
Leibniz University in Hanover, Germany (1857–66), southern facade

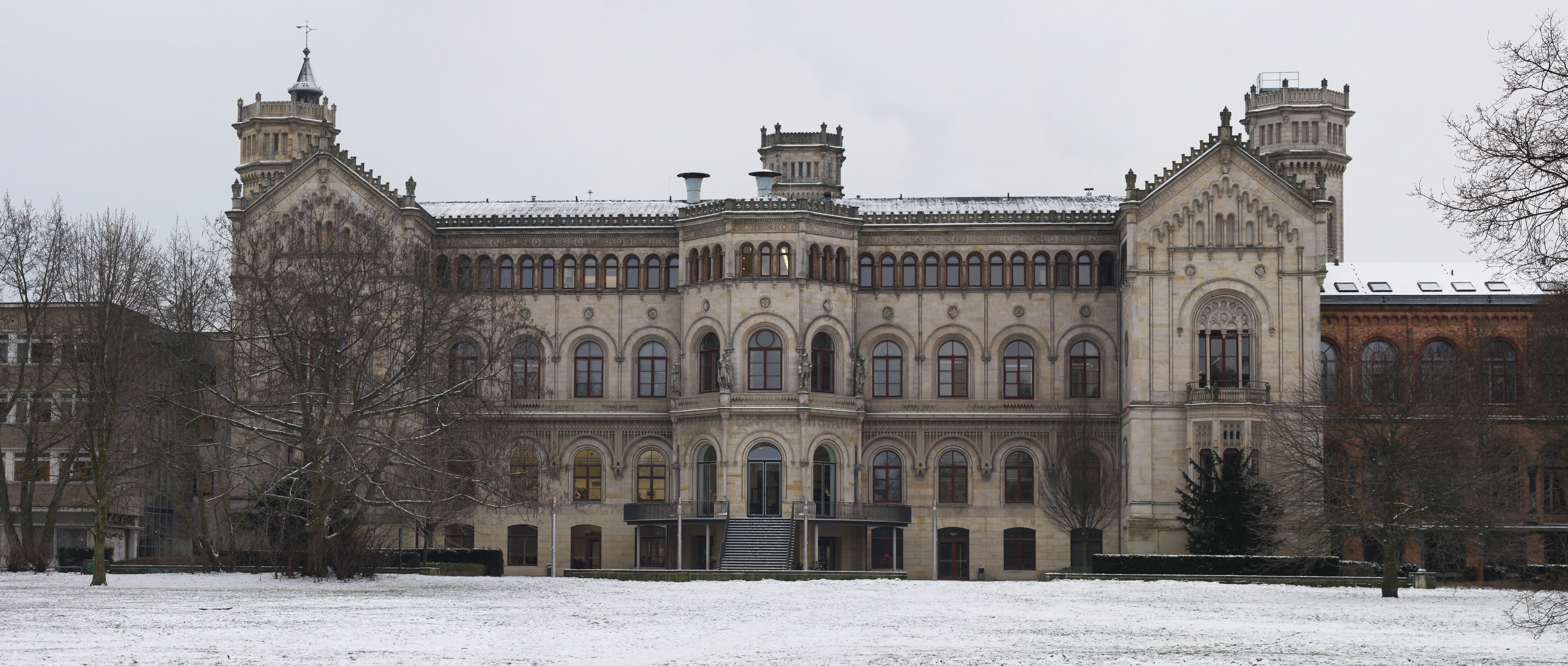
Leibniz University Hanover, northern facade

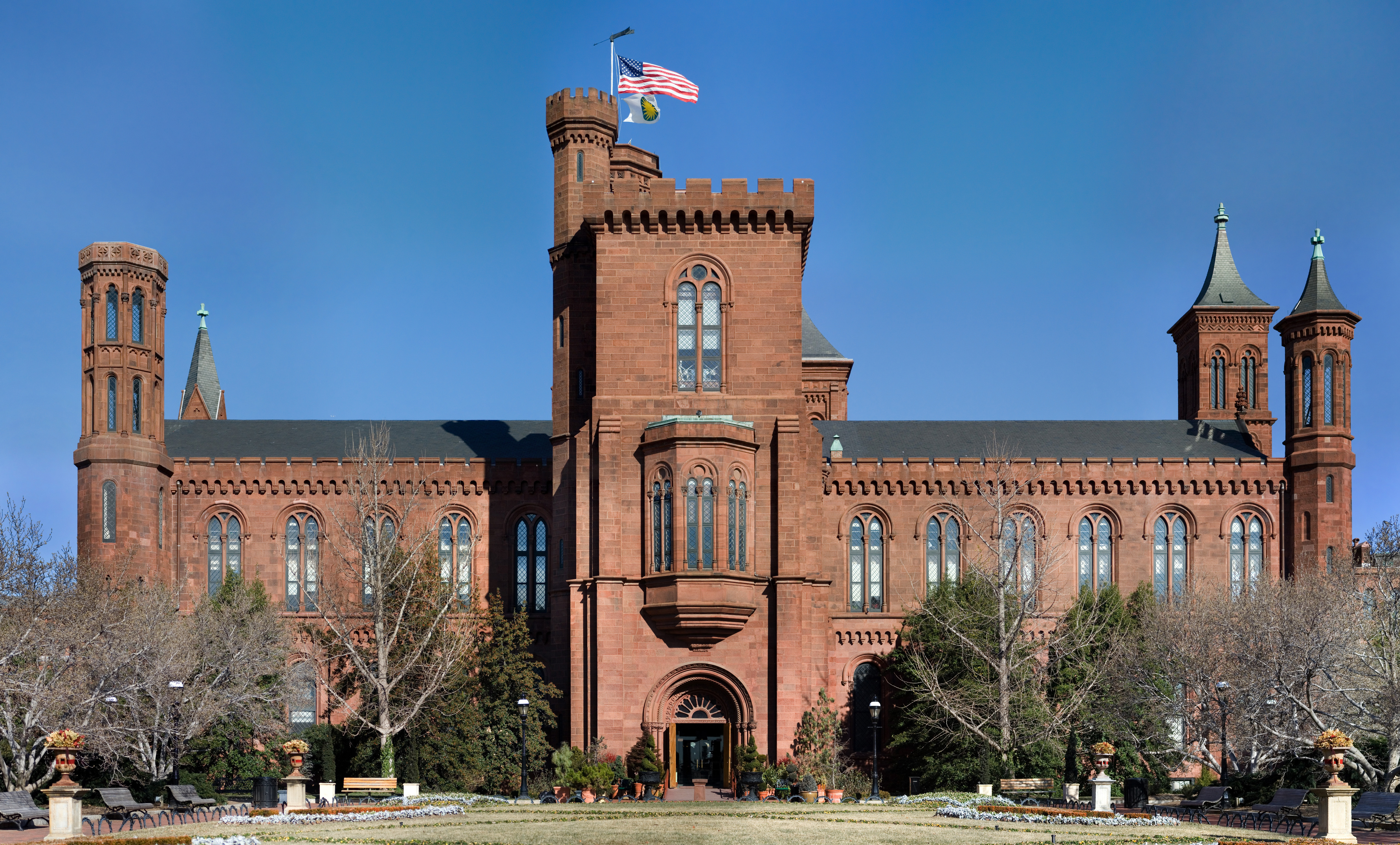
Smithsonian Institution (Washington, D.C.) (1849–55)

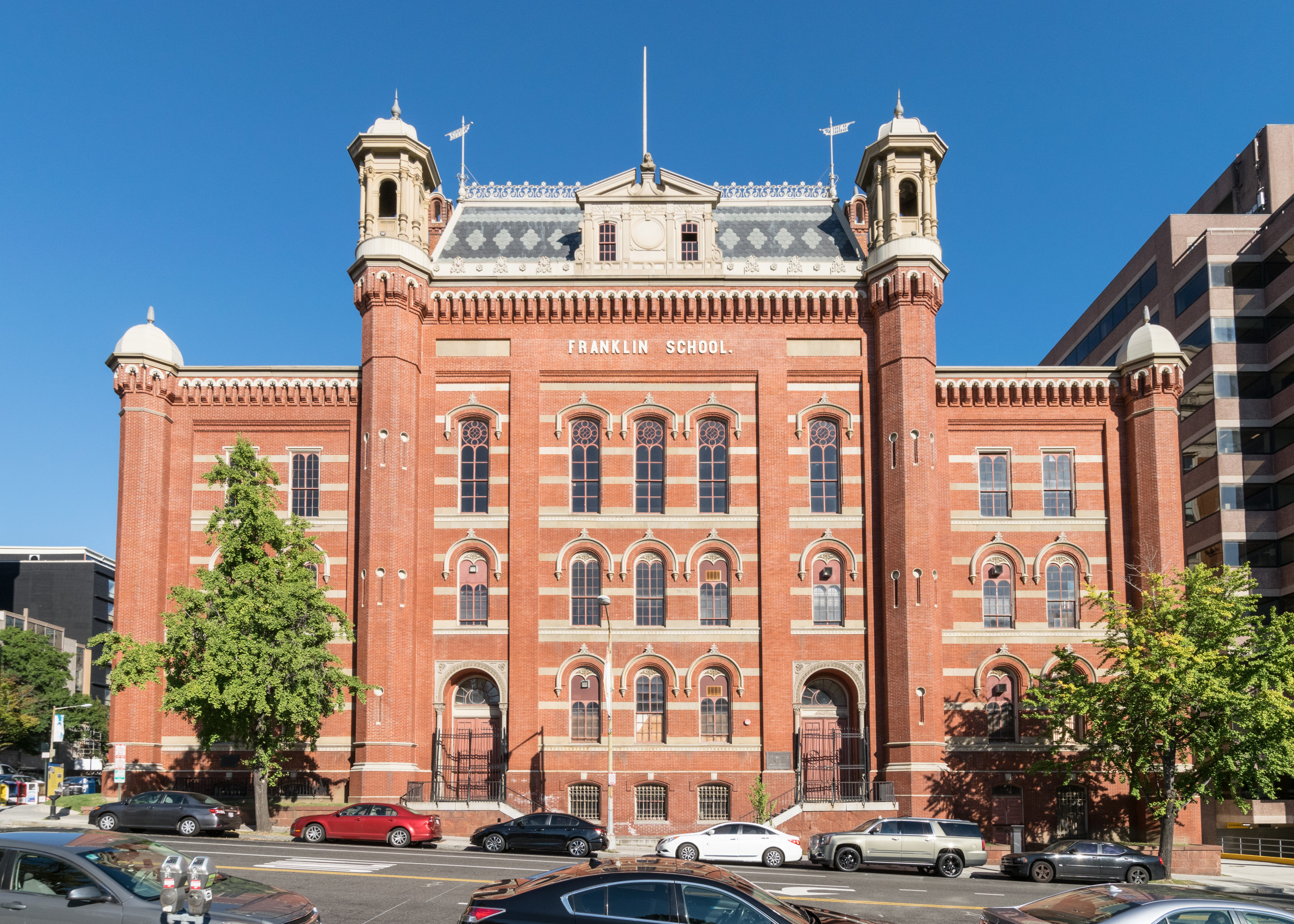
Franklin School (Washington, D.C.) (1869)

Rundbogenstil (round-arch style) is a 19th-century historic revival style of architecture popular in the German-speaking lands and the German diaspora. It combines elements of Byzantine, Romanesque, and Renaissance architecture with particular stylistic motifs. It forms a German branch of Romanesque Revival architecture sometimes used in other countries.

== History and description ==
The style was the deliberate creation of German architects seeking a German national style of architecture, particularly Heinrich Hübsch (1795–1863). It emerged in Germany as a response to and reaction against the neo-Gothic style that had come to the fore in the late 18th and early 19th centuries. By adopting the smooth facade of late antique and medieval church architecture, it aimed to extend and develop the noble simplicity and quiet grandeur of neo-classicism, while moving in a direction more suited to the rise of industrialism and the emergence of German nationalism. Hallmarks of the style, in addition to the rounded arches from which it takes its name, include "eyebrows" over the windows and inverted crenelation under the eaves.

Rundbogenstil was employed for a number of railway stations, including those in Berlin, Karlsruhe, Leipzig, Munich, Tübingen, and Völklingen. These were typically "first-generation" stations (built between 1835 and 1870); some were razed to be replaced by larger buildings. Those in Berlin, Tübingen, Königs Wusterhausen, Crimmitschau, and Hersfeld are still extant, while the Bavarian station in Leipzig is partially preserved.

Rundbogenstil was widely adopted in Central European synagogue design of the late nineteenth century. The first in this style was the Kassel Synagogue designed by Albrecht Rosengarten, a member of the Jewish congregation in Kassel, Electorate of Hesse, and completed in 1839. An early example in the United States is the Gates of Heaven Synagogue in Madison, Wisconsin, built in 1863 and designed by August Kutzbock, an immigrant from Bremen, Germany. Kutzbock also (co)designed secular buildings employing Rundbogenstil, such as the Carrie Pierce House (1857) and the Van Slyke/Keenan House (1858) in Madison.

Rundbogenstil architecture was influential in England, with Alfred Waterhouse's buildings for what is now called the Natural History Museum (originally the British Museum Natural History Collection) in London showing a direct and self-conscious emulation of the style.

== Rundbogenstil German synagogues ==
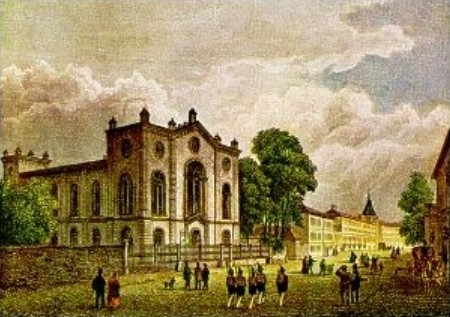
Kassel (1839; destroyed in the Kristallnacht 1938)

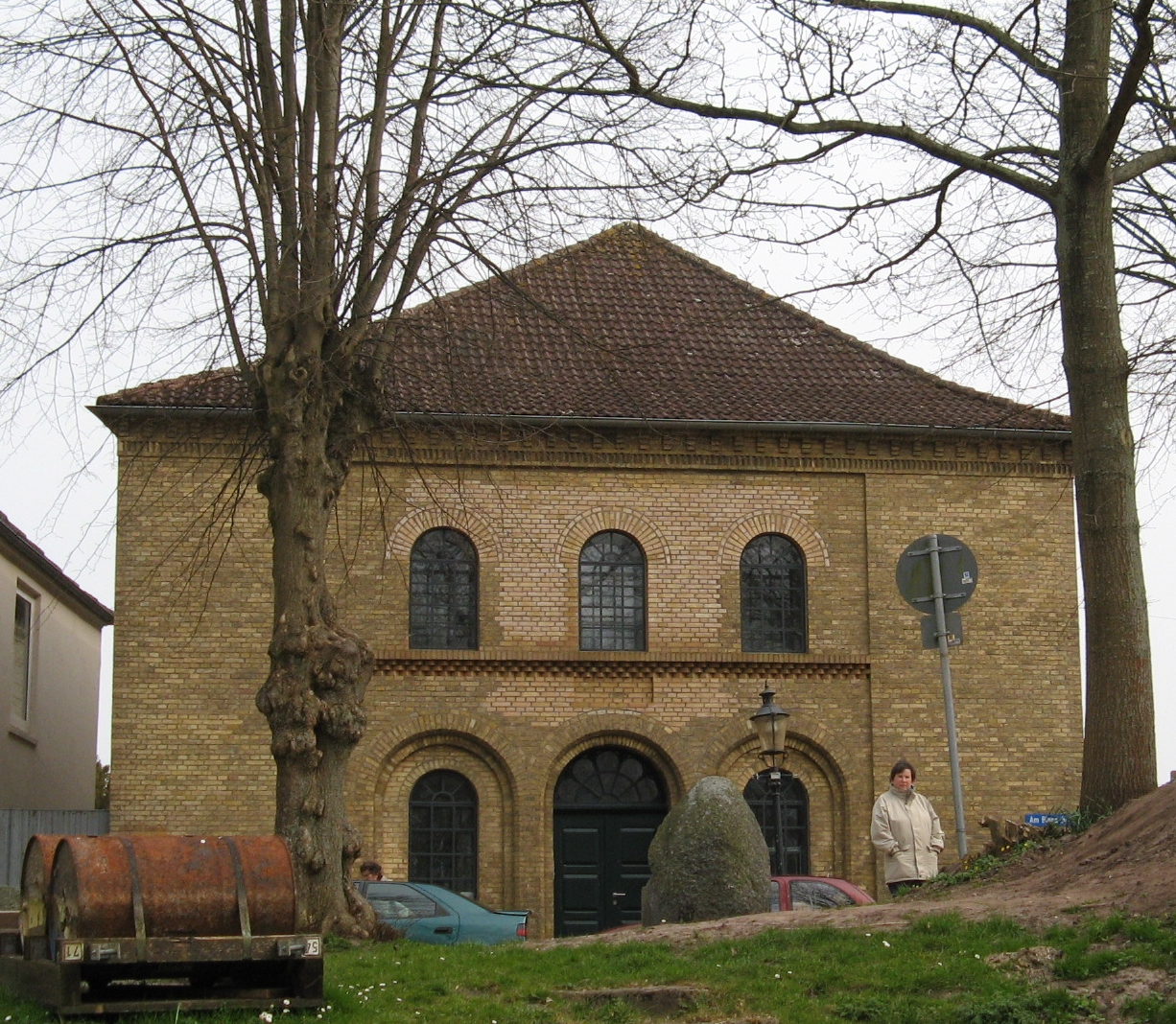
Friedrichstadt (1845)

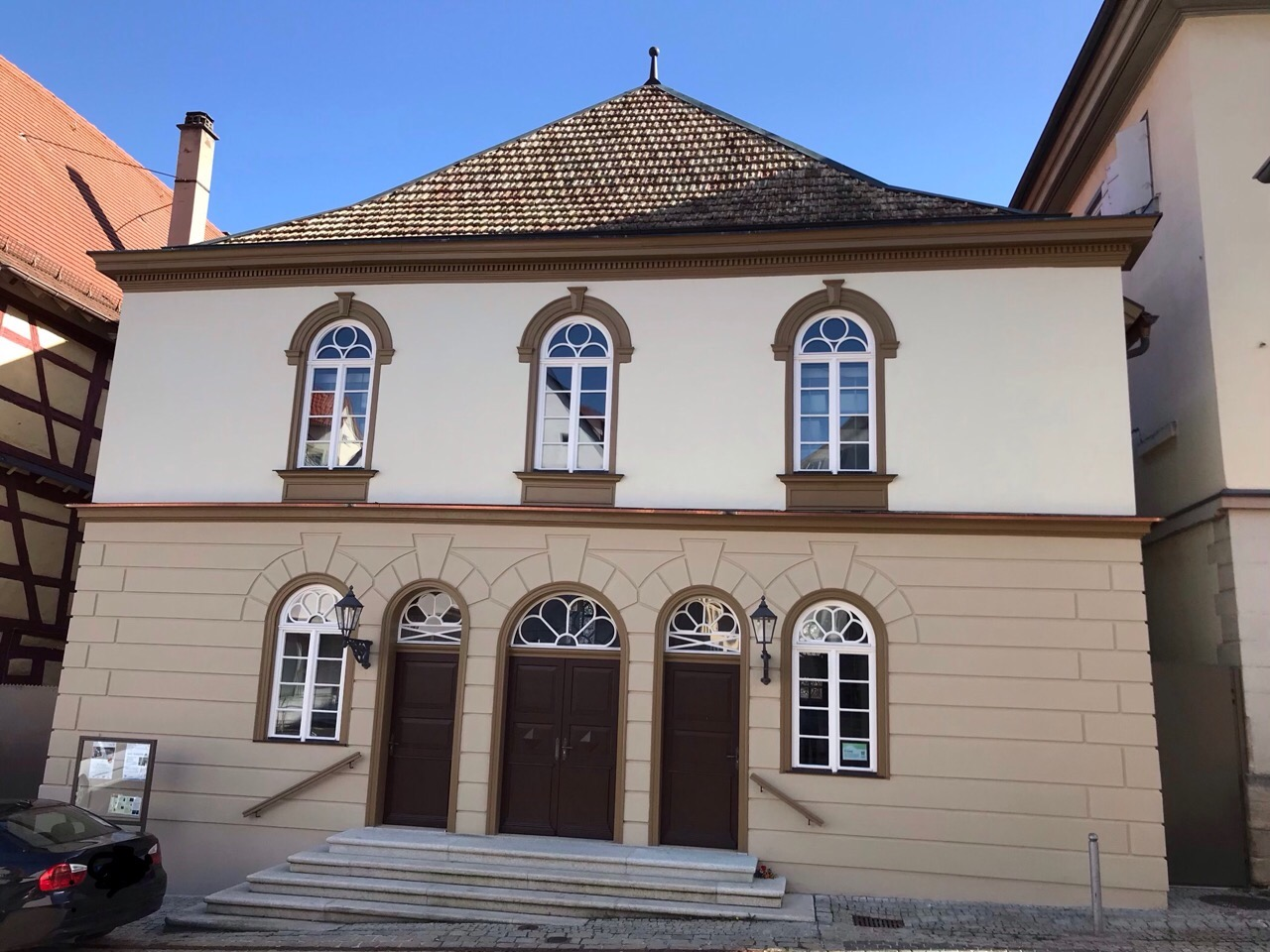
Hechingen (1850–52; facade 1881)

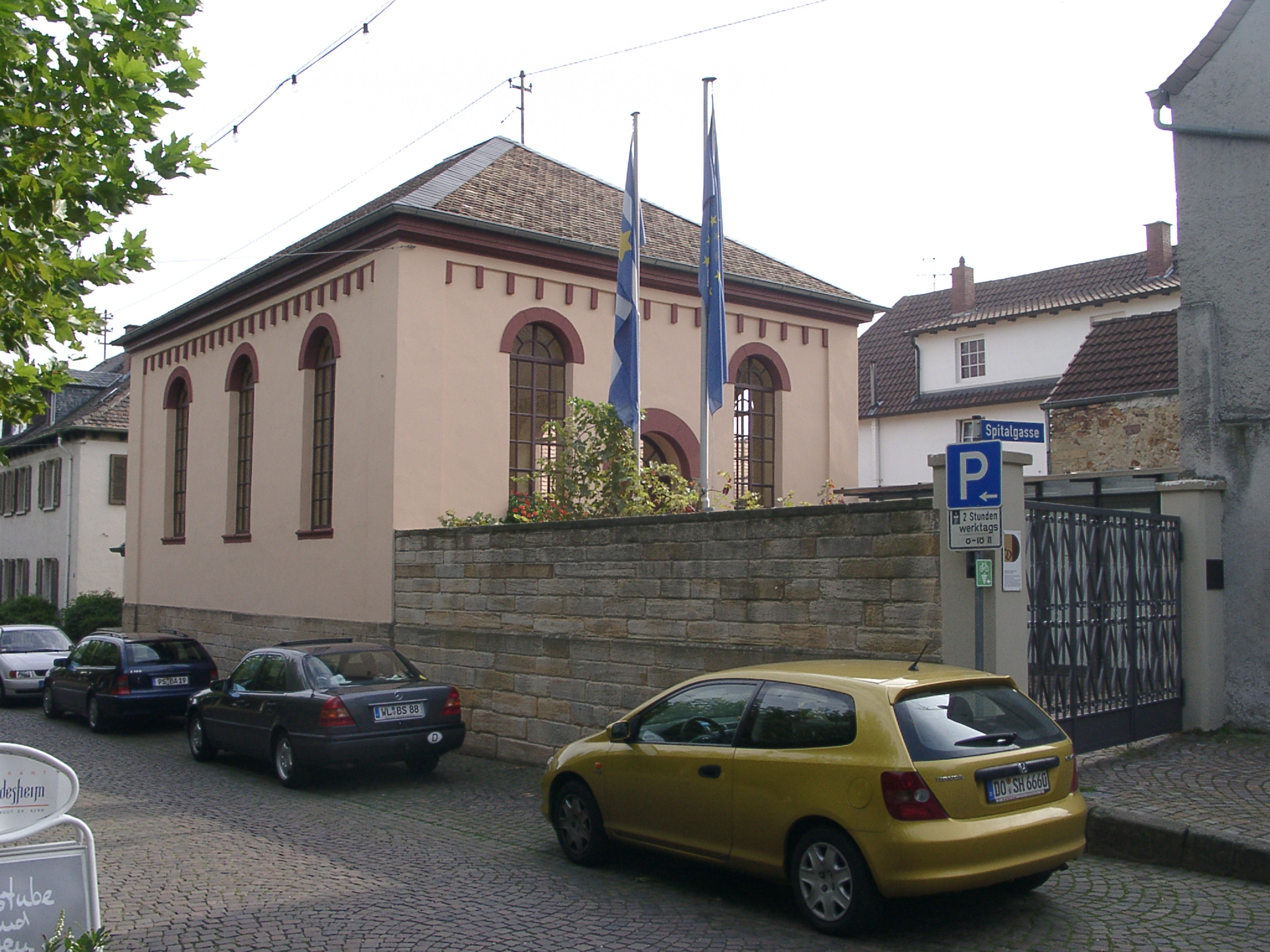
Deidesheim (1854)

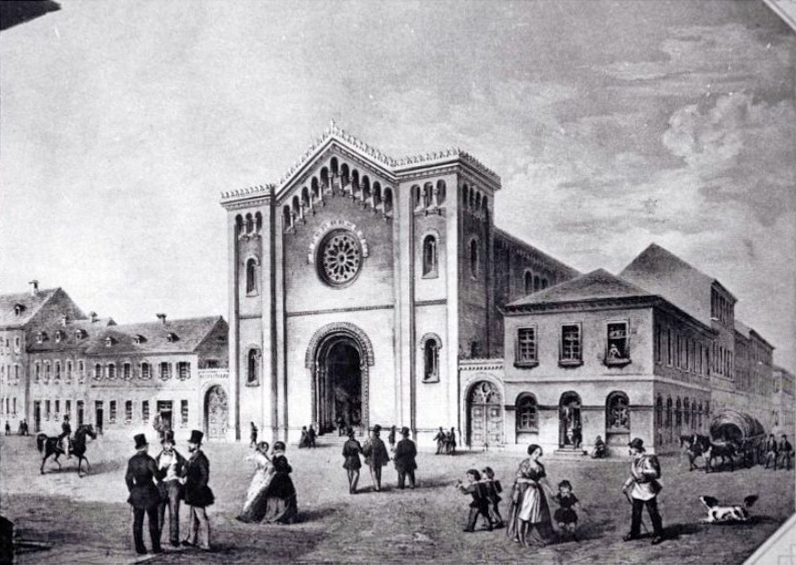
Mannheim (1855; destroyed in the Kristallnacht 1938)

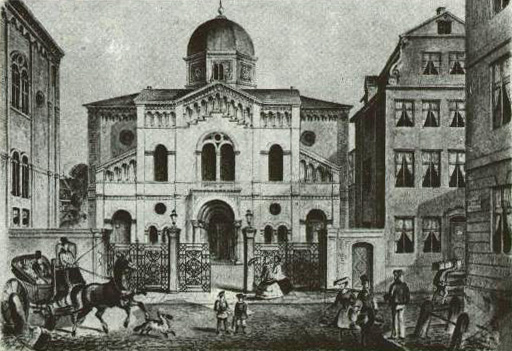
Hamburg (1859; demolished 1934)

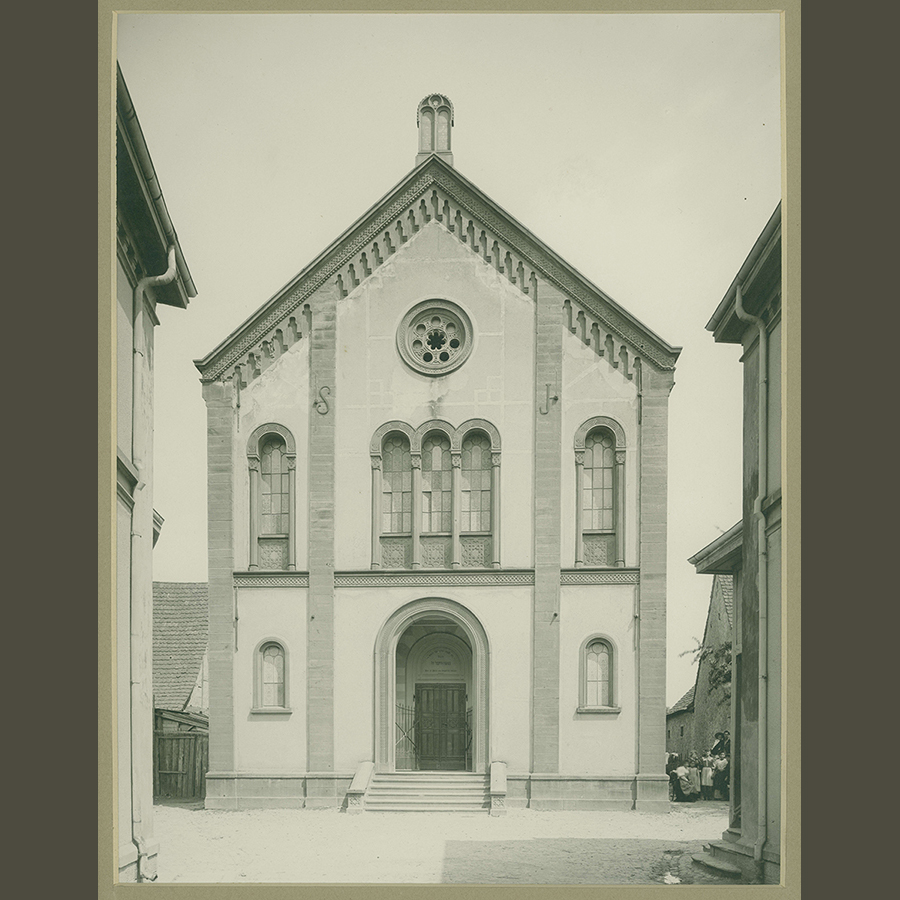
Ihringen (1860; destroyed in the Kristallnacht 1938)

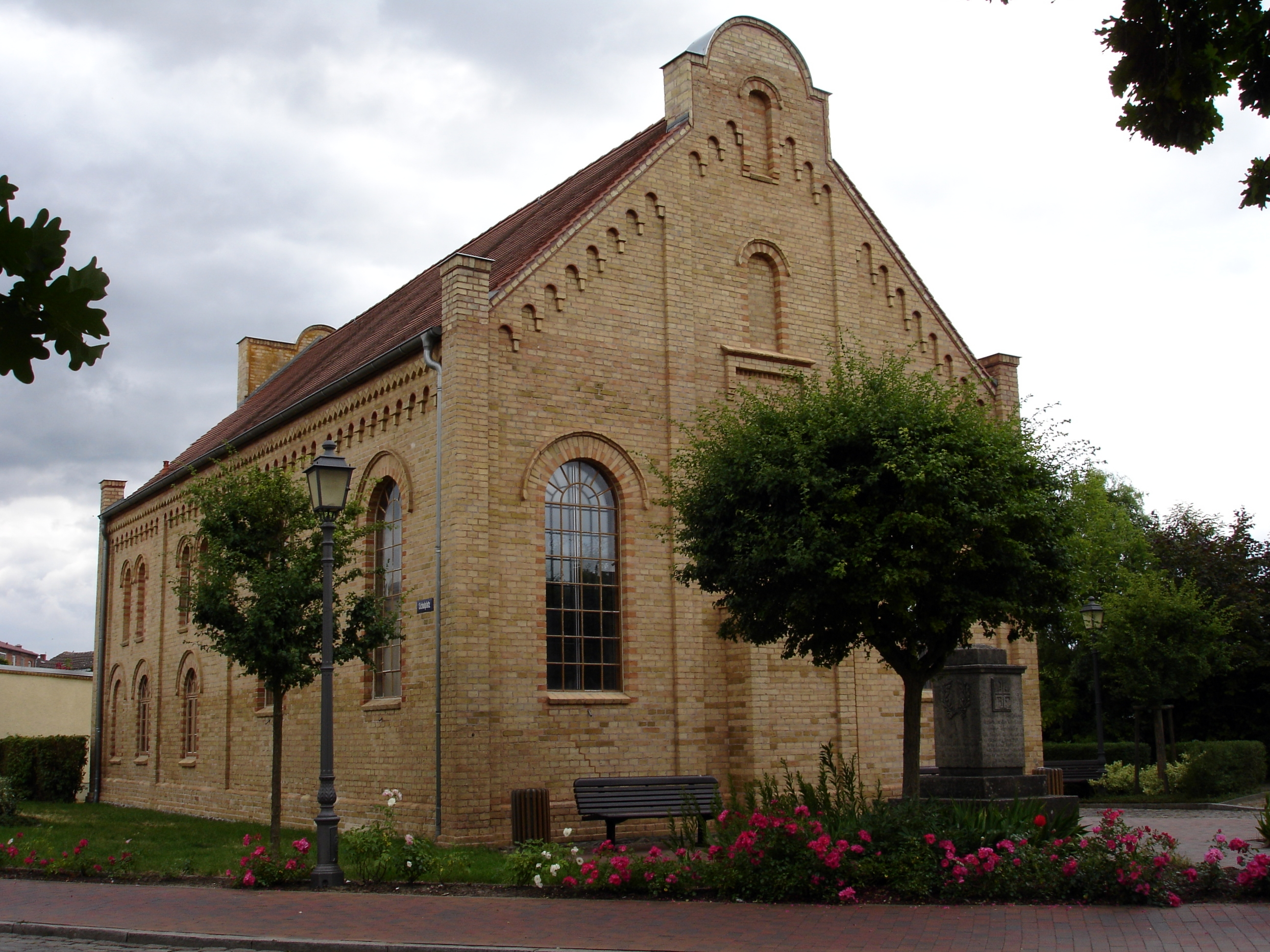
Krakow am See (1866)

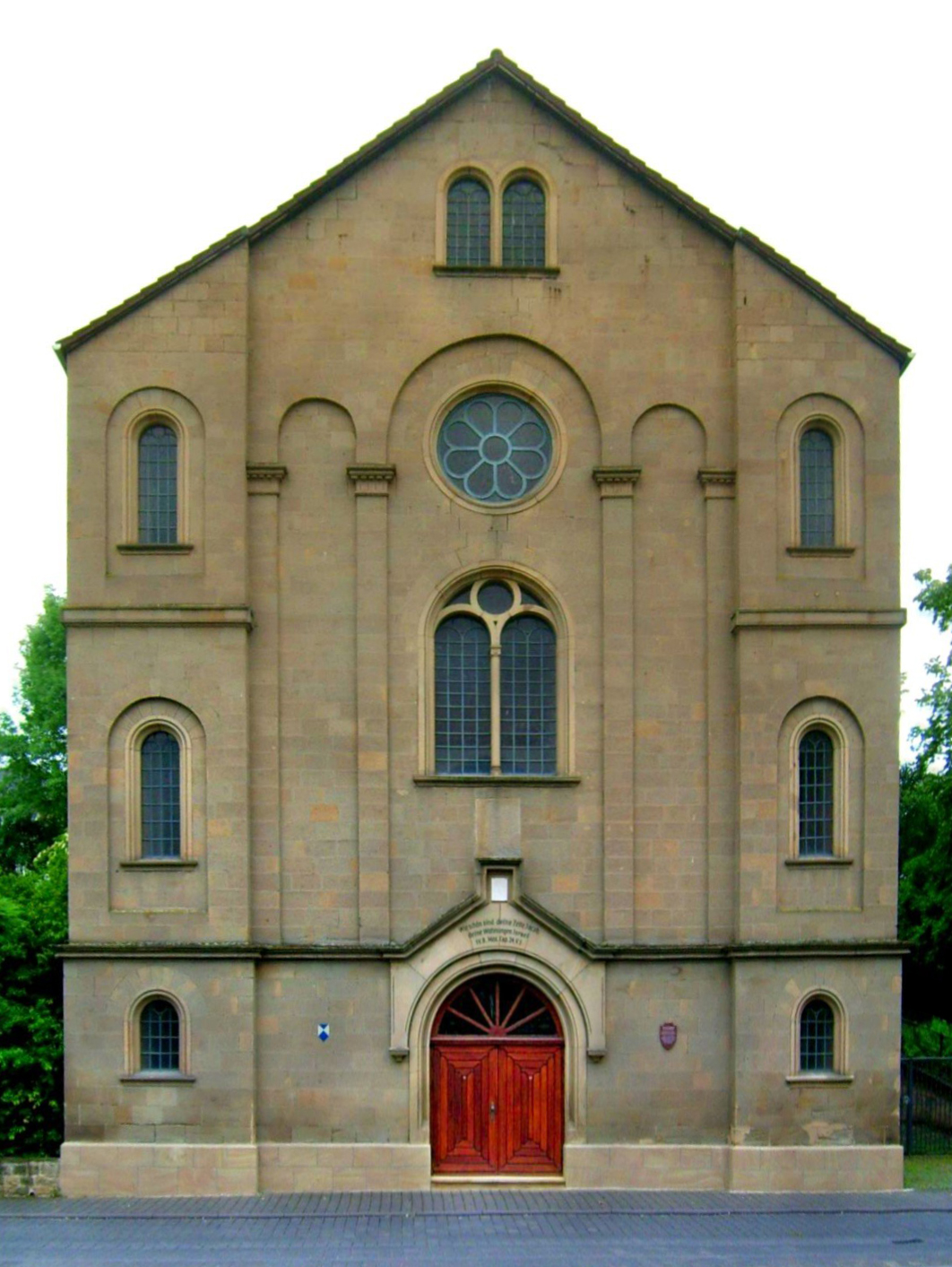
Meisenheim (1866)

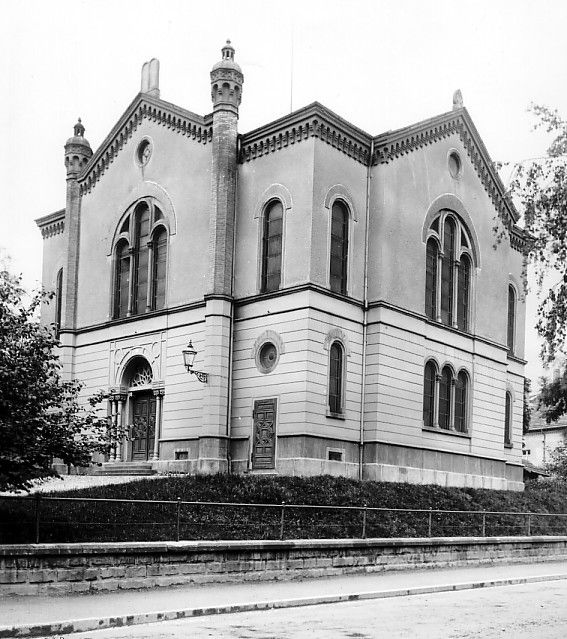
Freiburg (1870; destroyed in the Kristallnacht 1938)

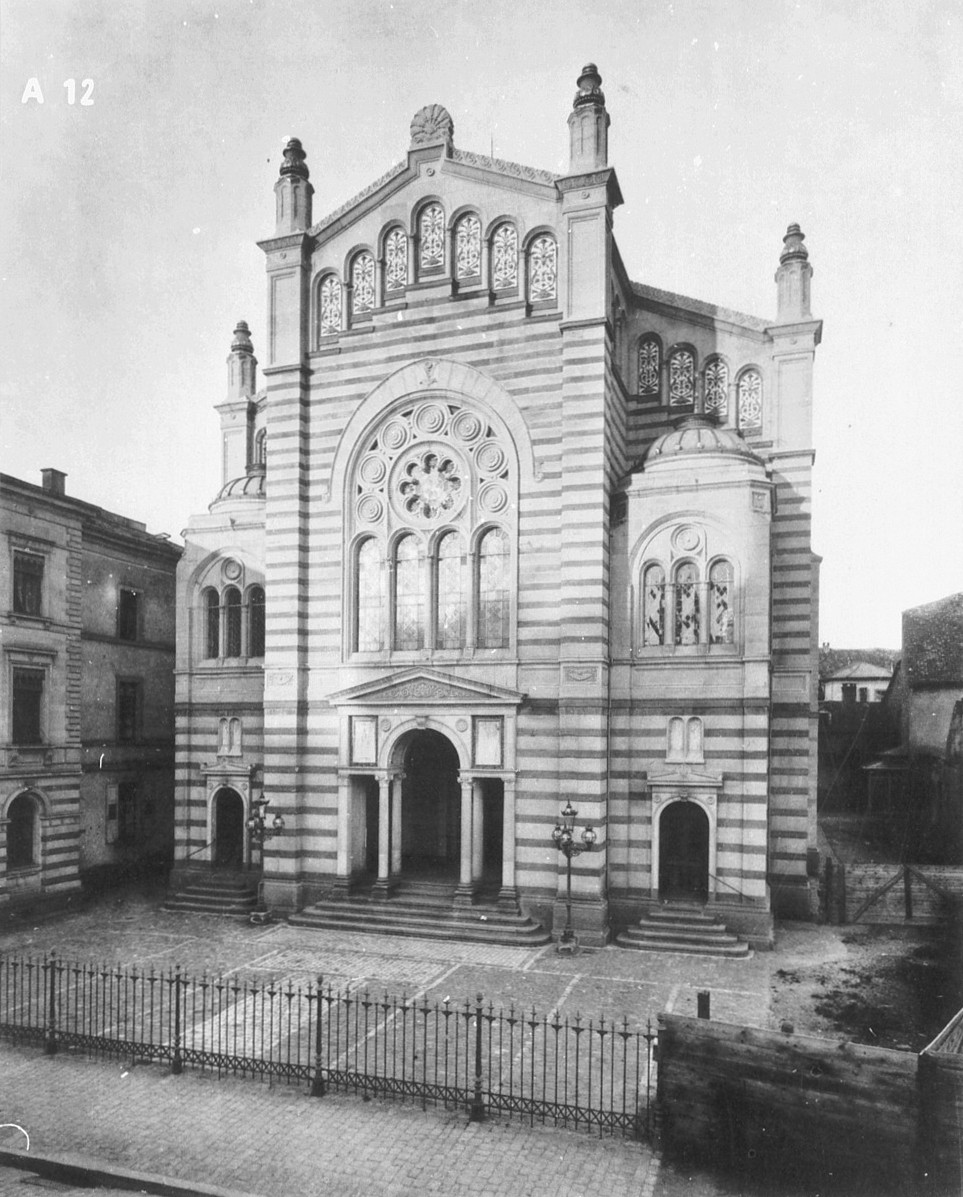
Karlsruhe (1875; destroyed in the Kristallnacht 1938)

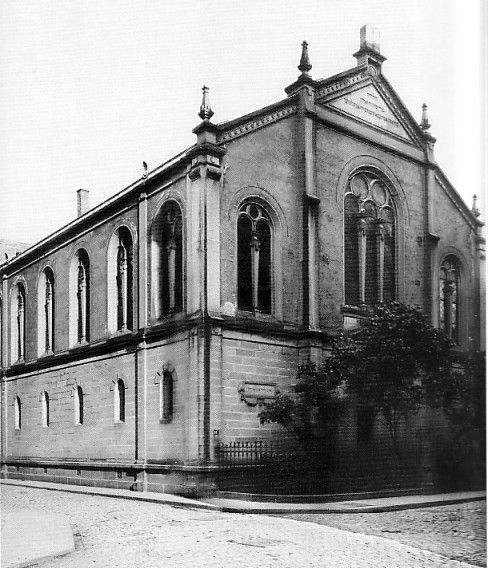
Heidelberg (1878; destroyed in the Kristallnacht 1938)

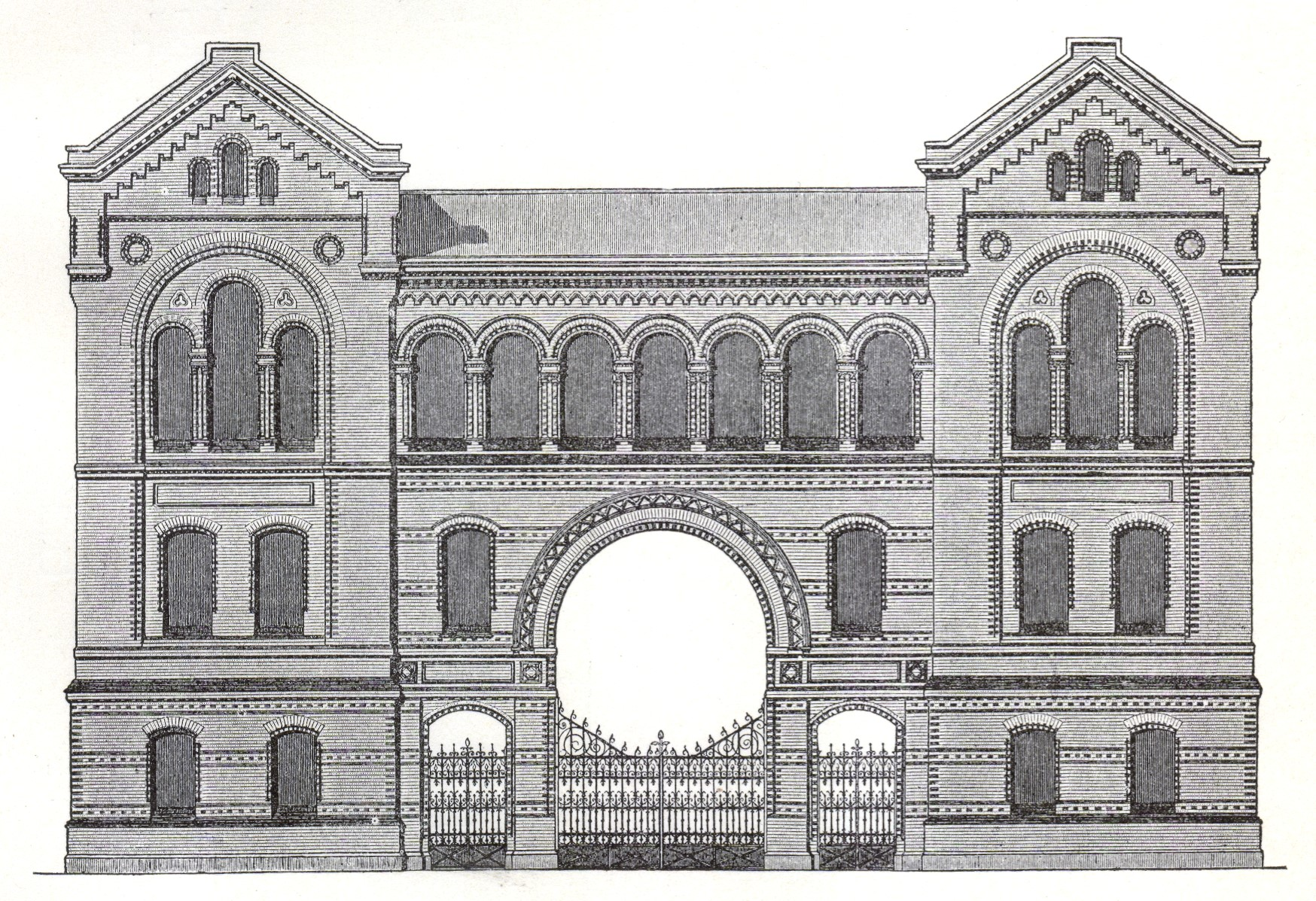
Berlin Lindenstrasse (1890–91; damaged in the Kristallnacht 1938, destroyed 1945)

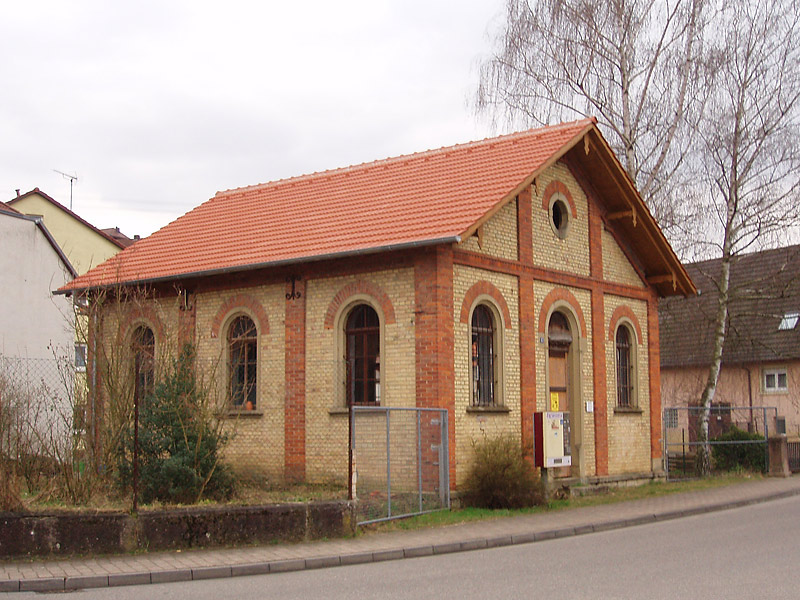
Steinsfurt (1893)

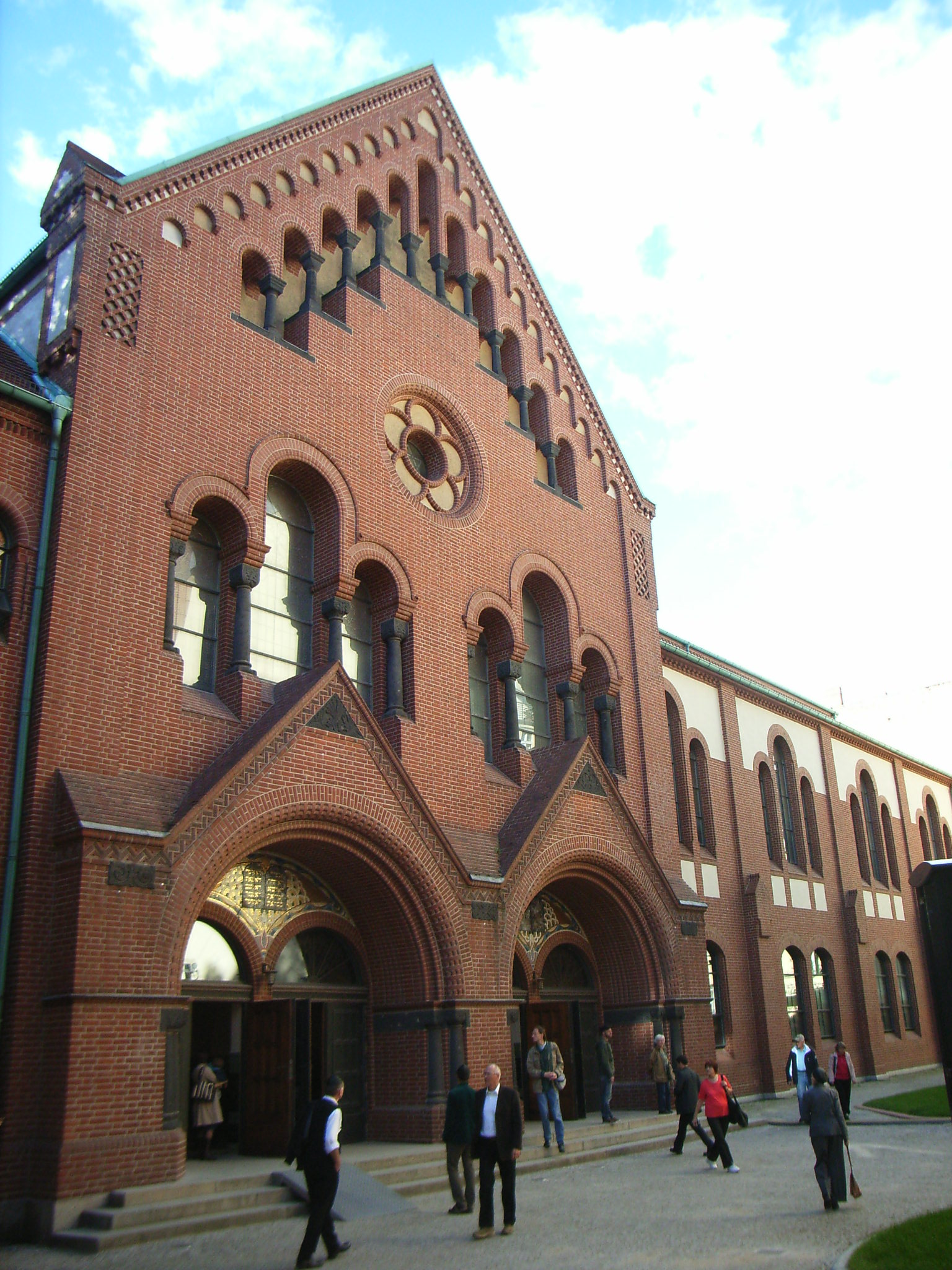
Berlin Rykestrasse (1904)

== Rundbogenstil German train stations ==
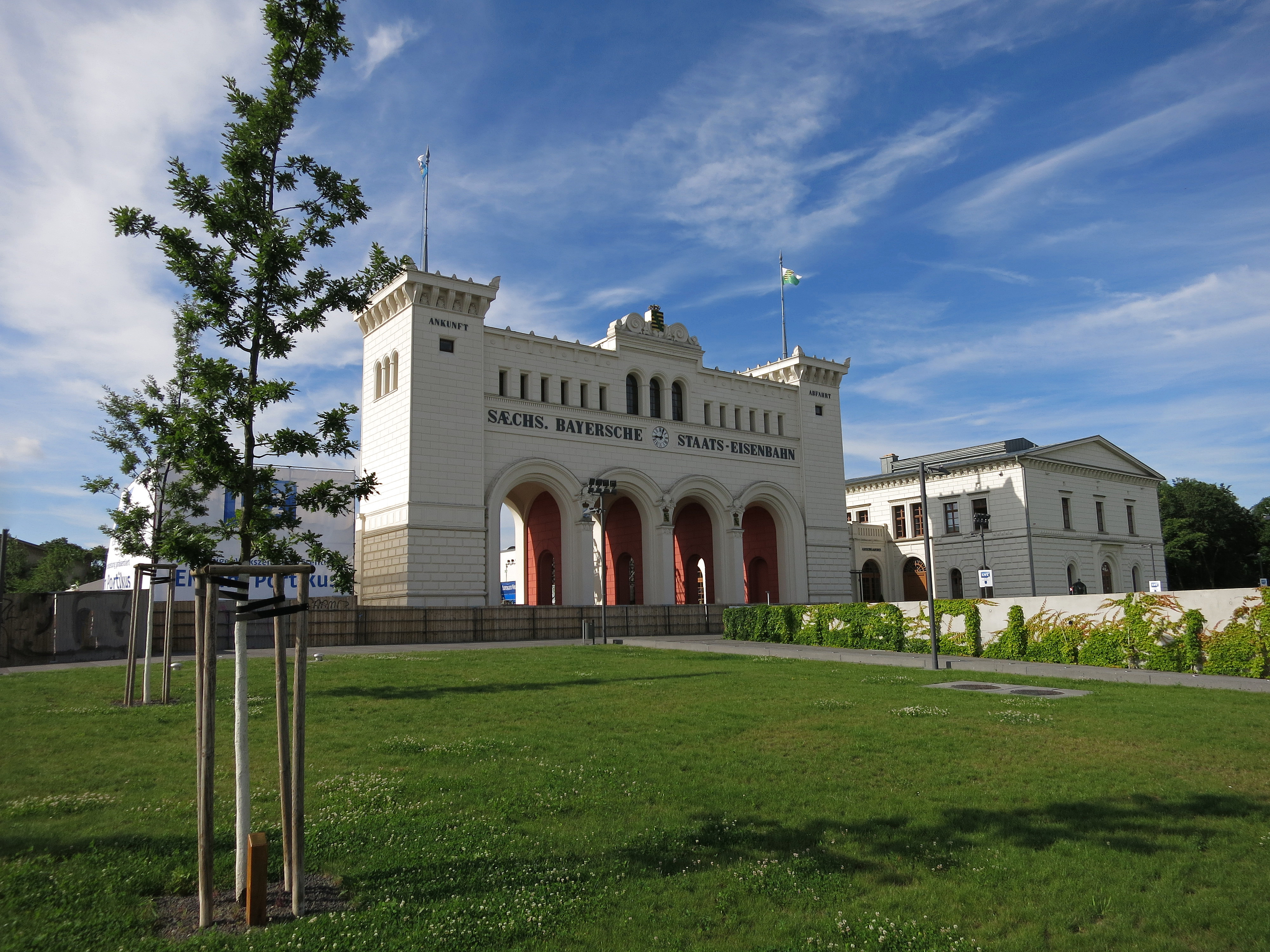
Leipzig (Bavarian station) (1842)

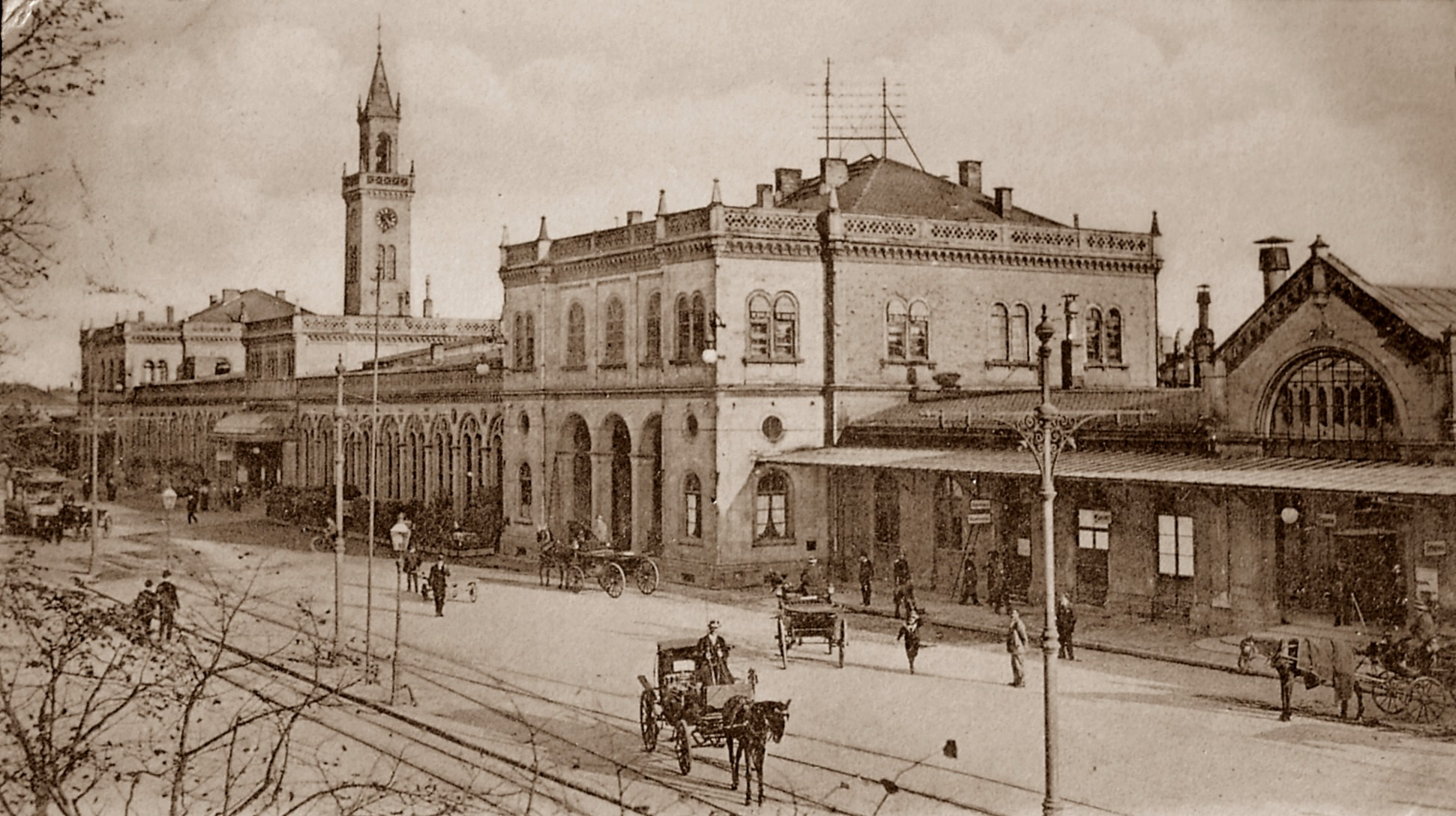
Karlsruhe (1843)

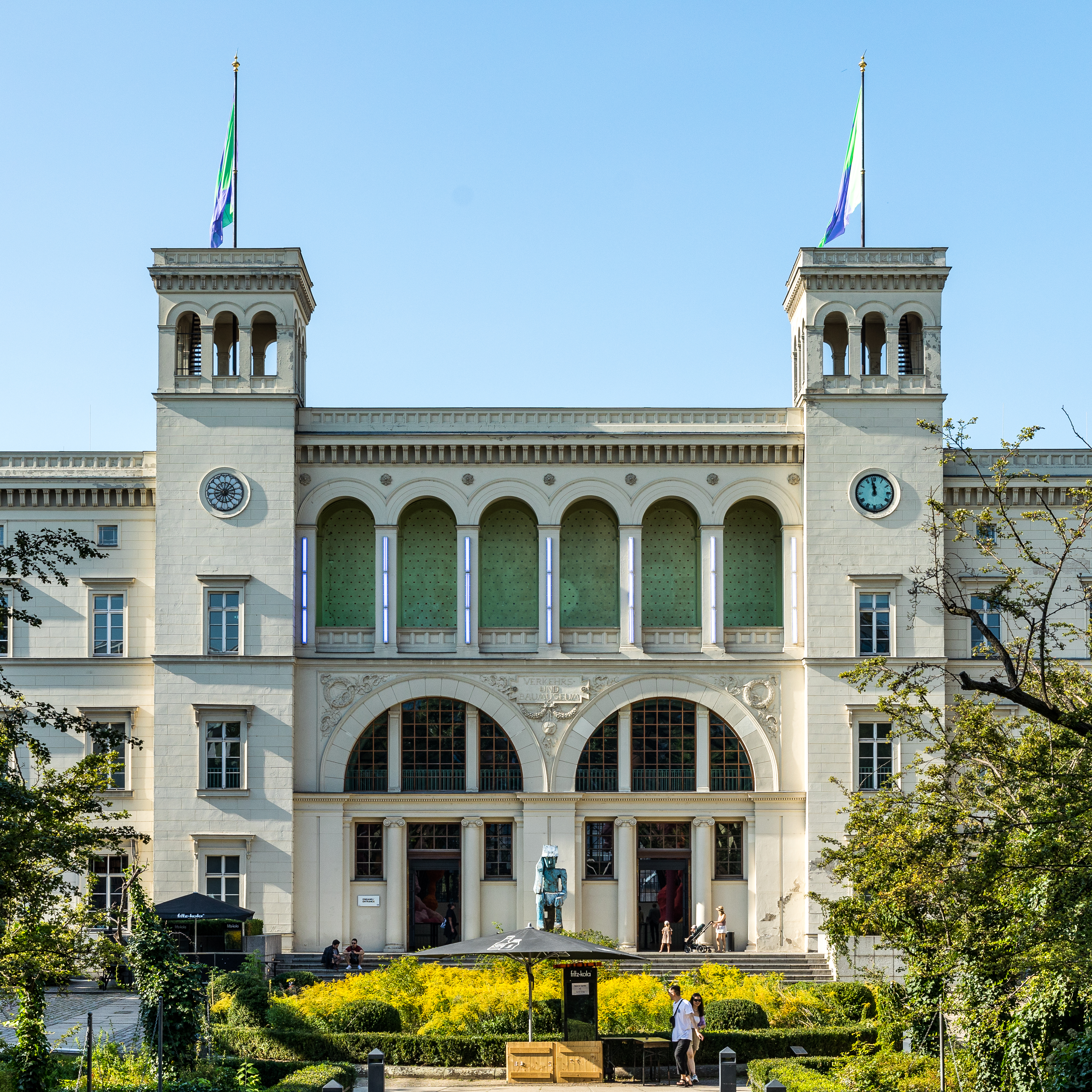
Berlin (Hamburg station) (1846–47)

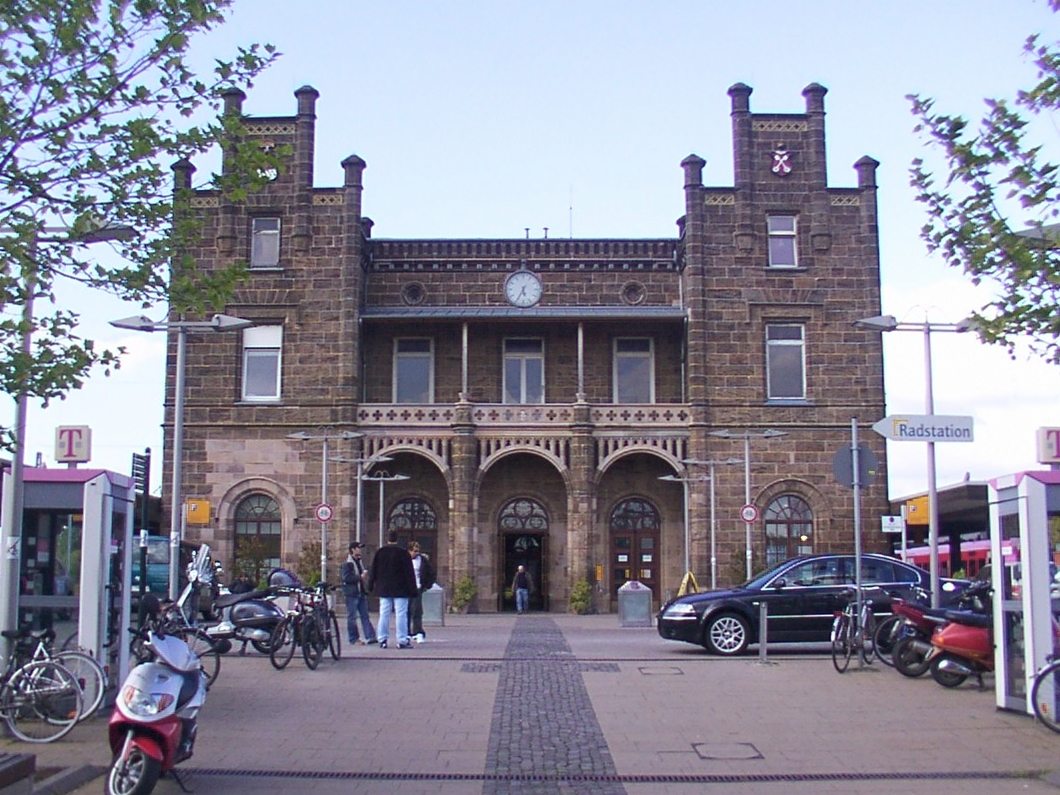
Minden (1847)

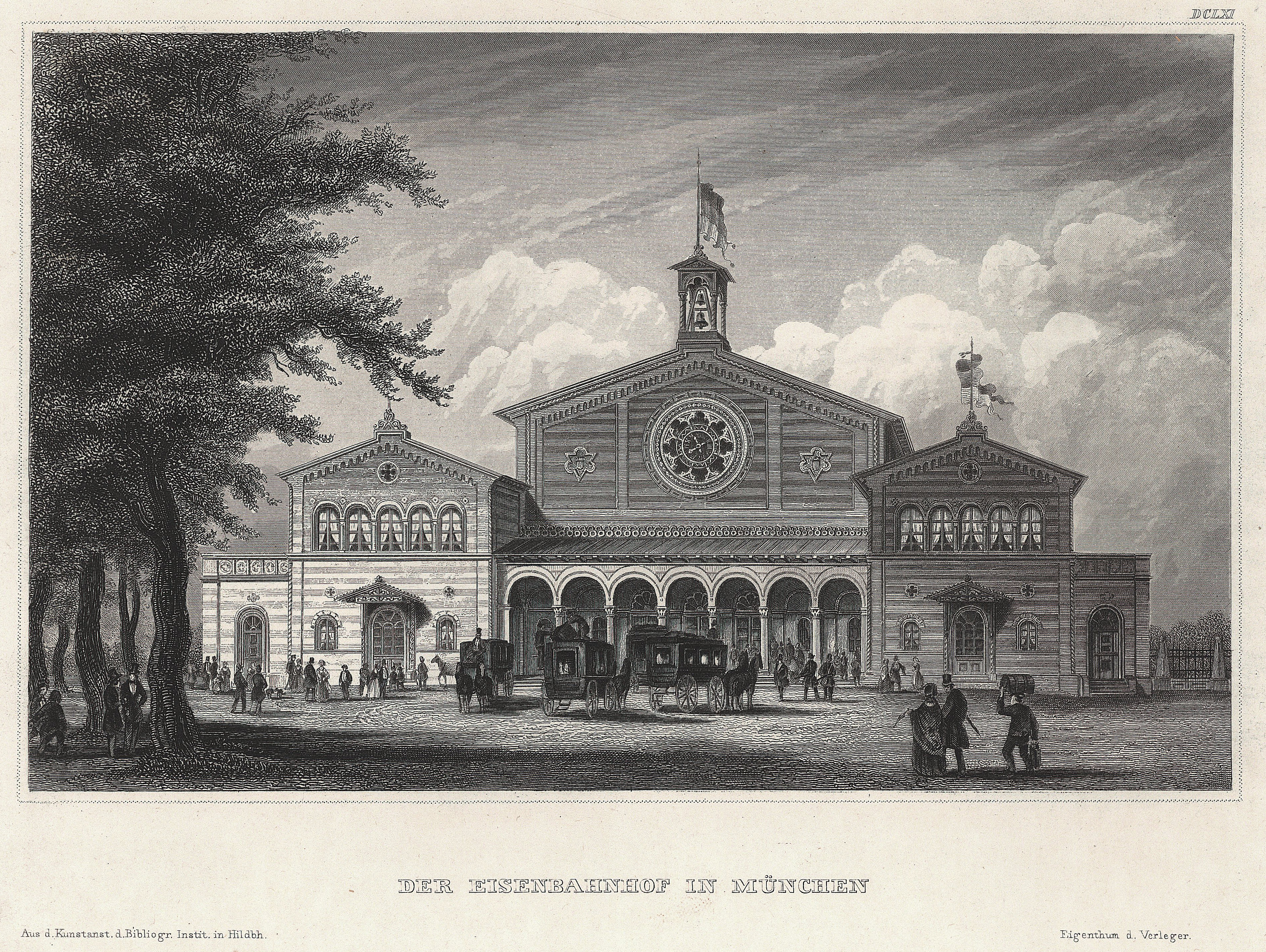
Munich (1849)

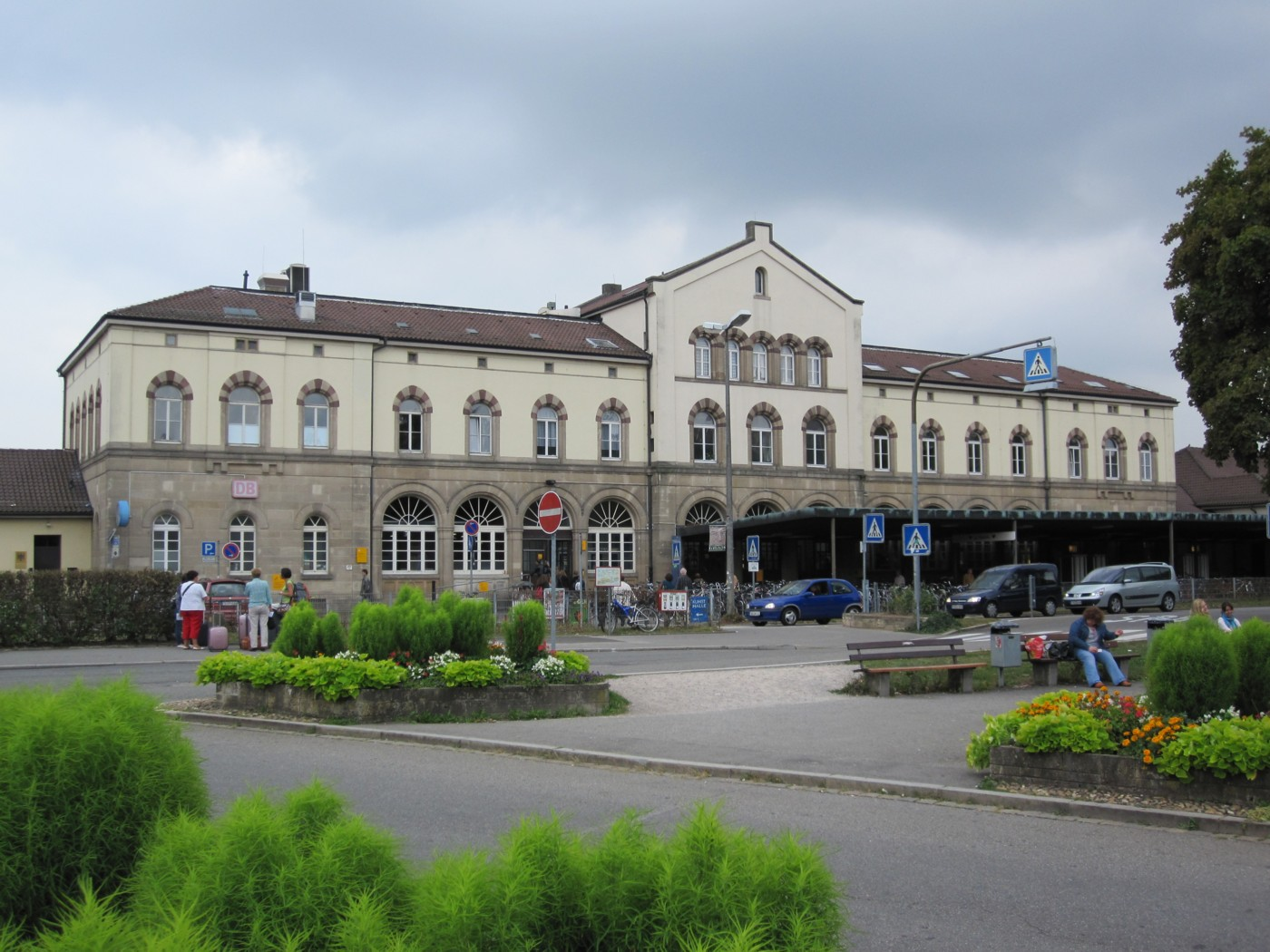
Tübingen (1861–62)

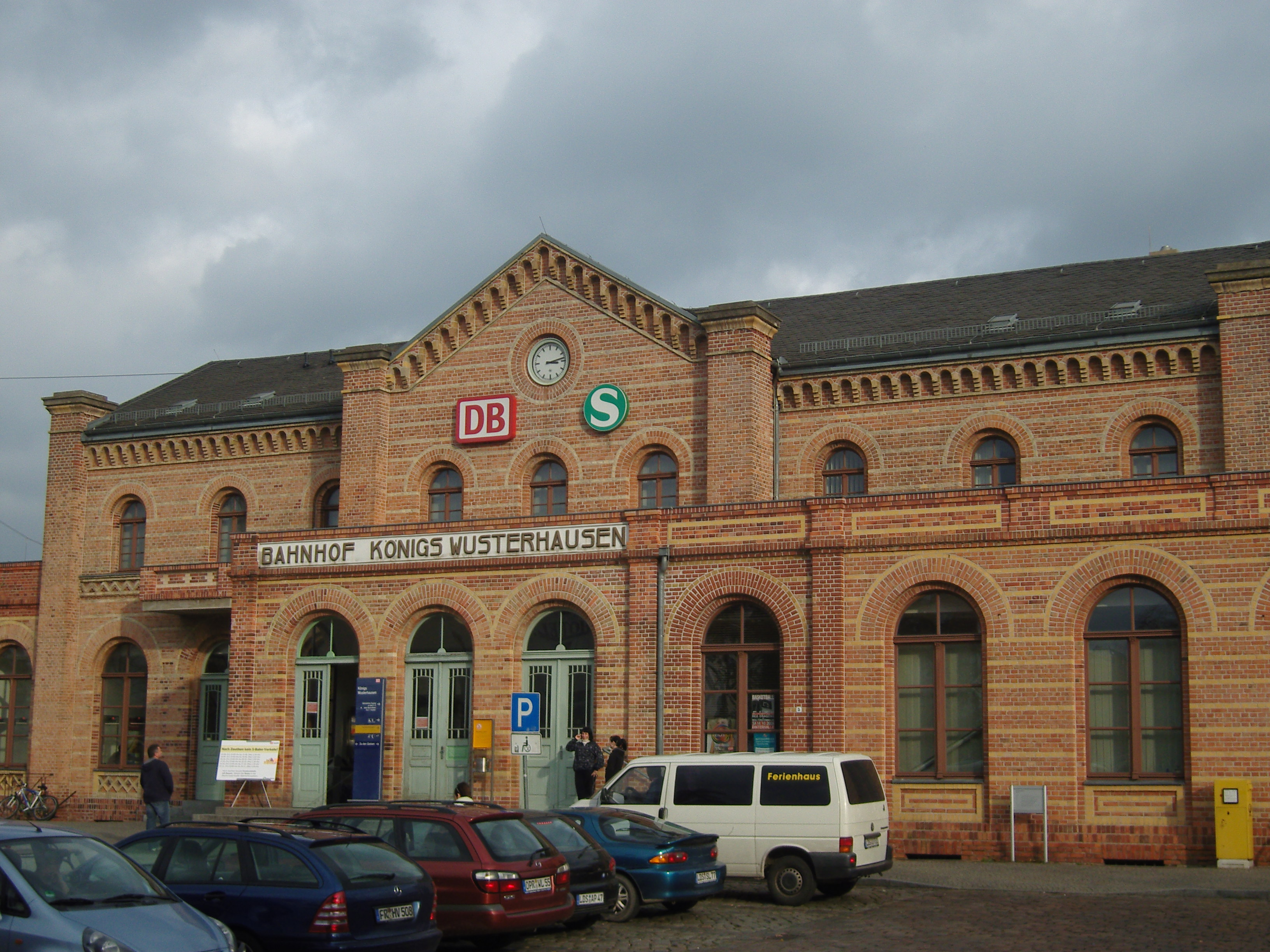
Königs Wusterhausen (1866)

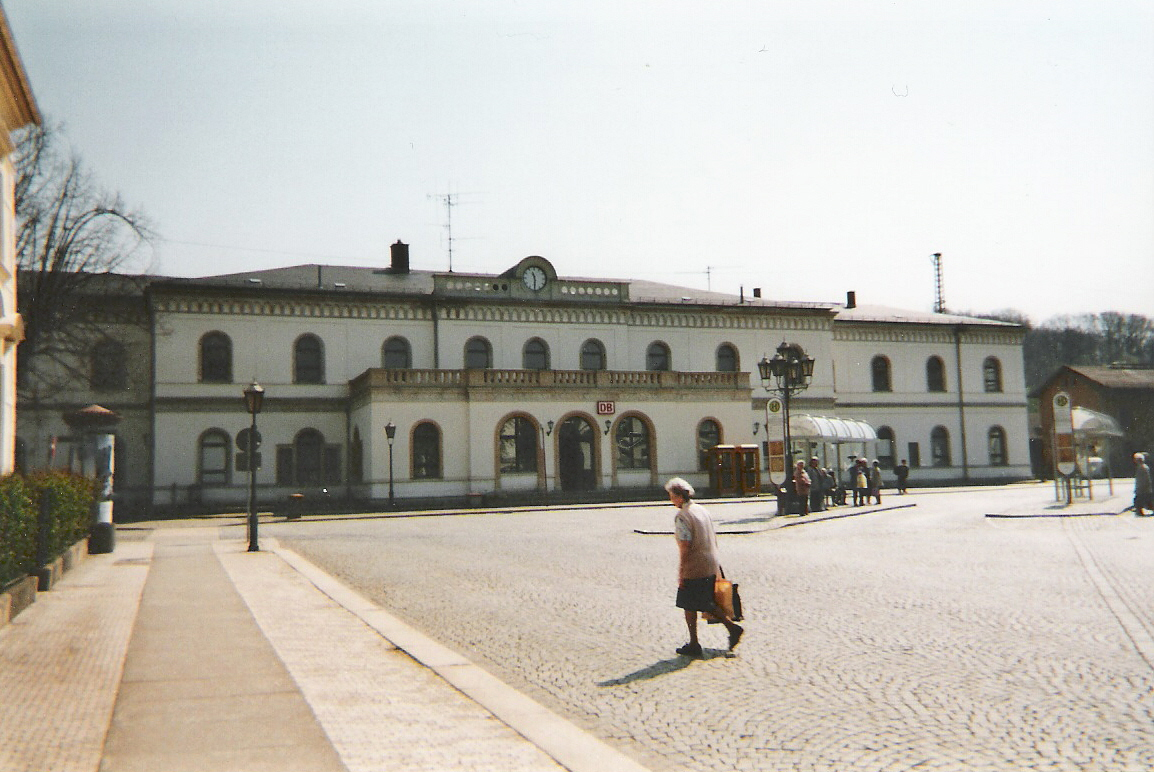
Crimmitschau (1873)

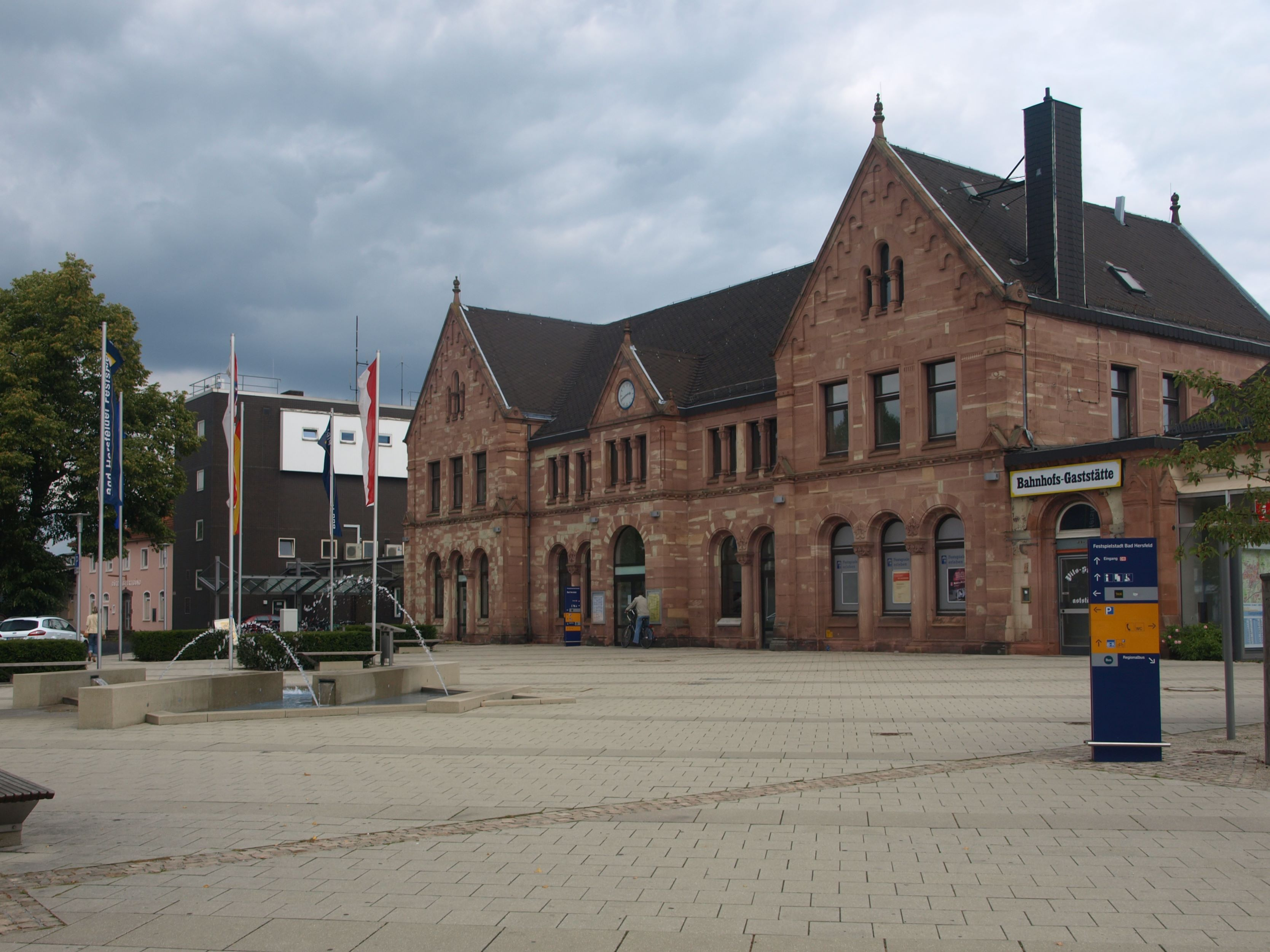
Hersfeld (1883)

== Rundbogenstil architecture in New York City ==
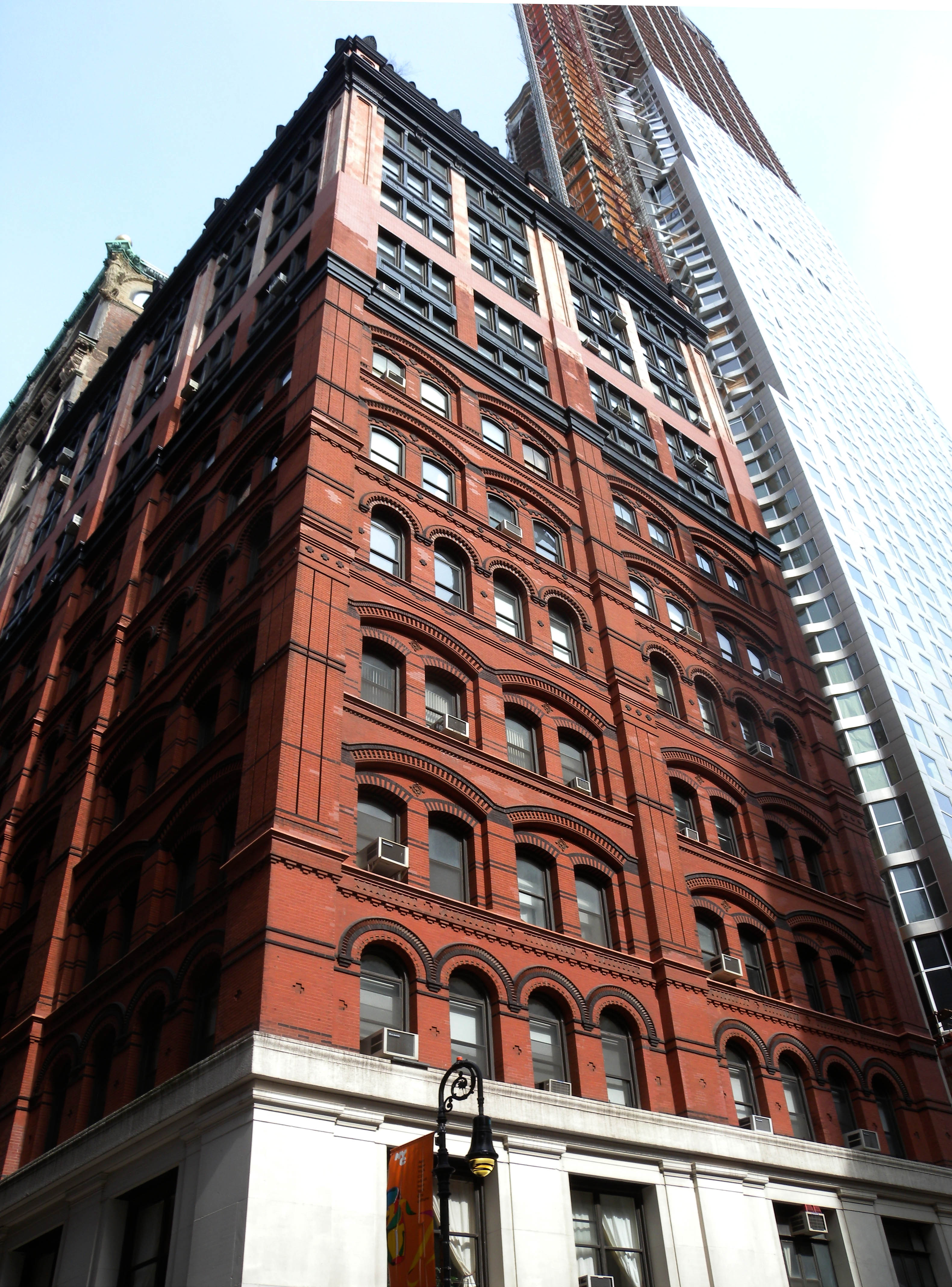
Morse Building on Nassau Street, Manhattan (1878–80)

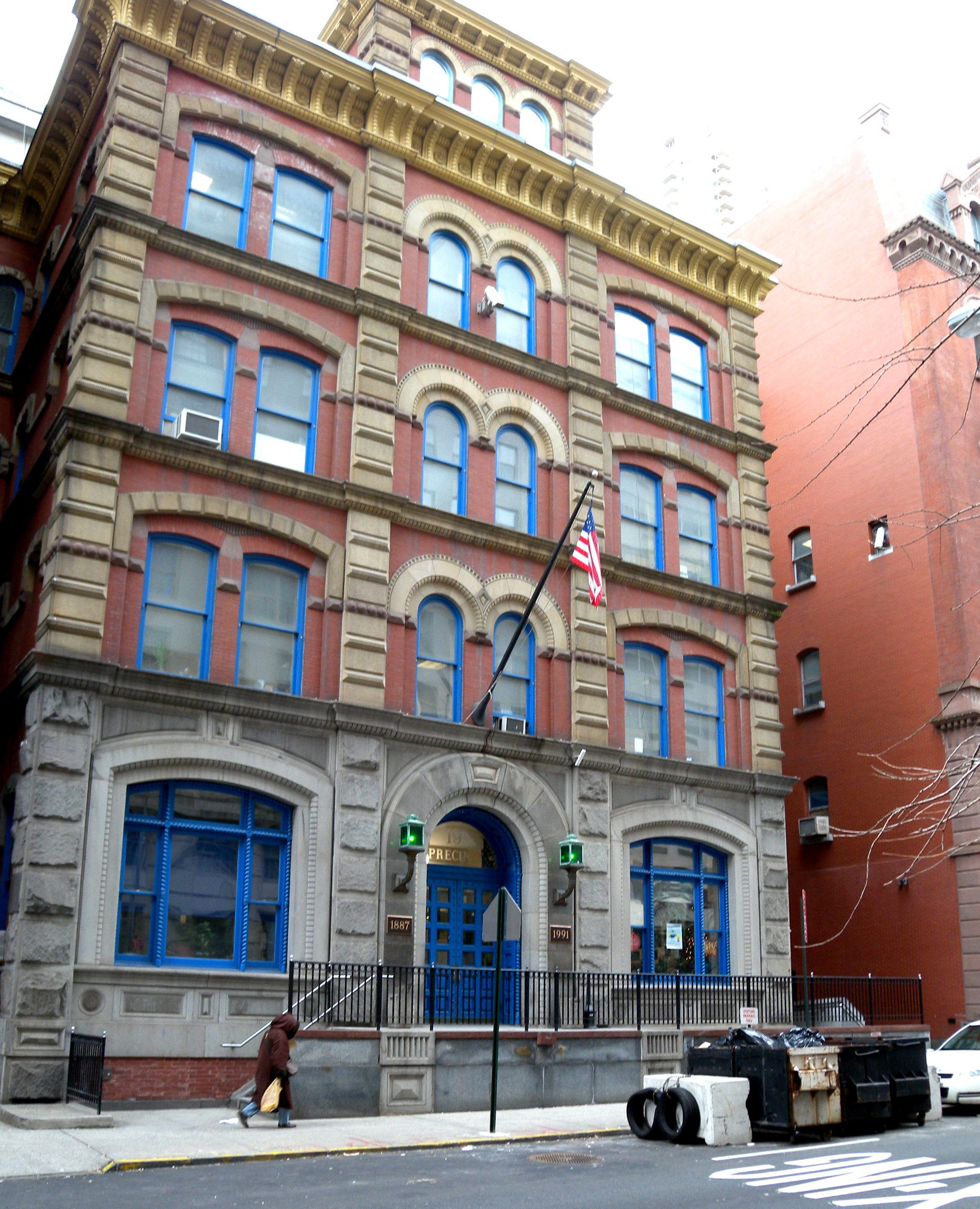
19th Precinct, 153 East 67th Street, Manhattan

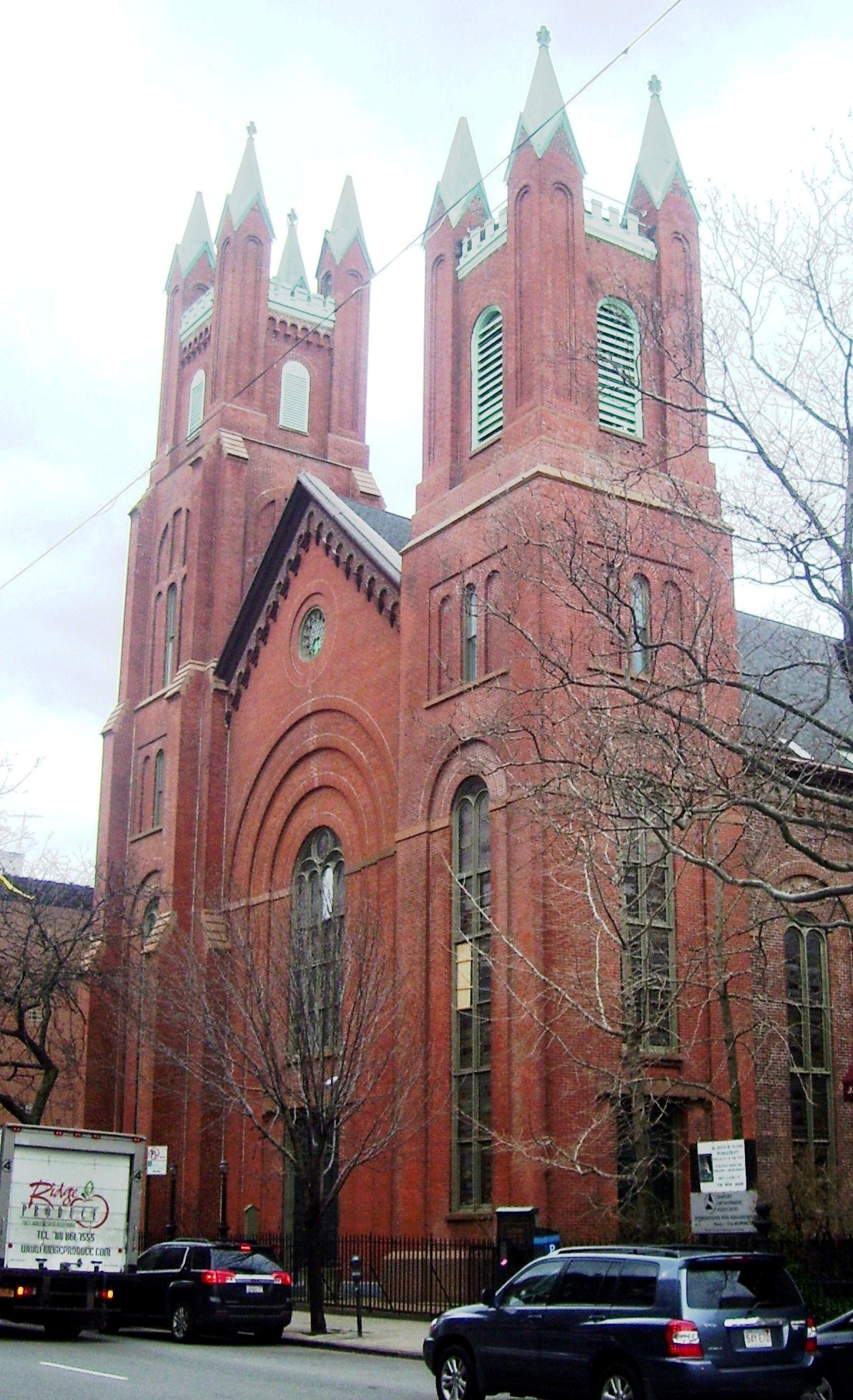
South Congregational Church, Carroll Gardens, Brooklyn (1857)

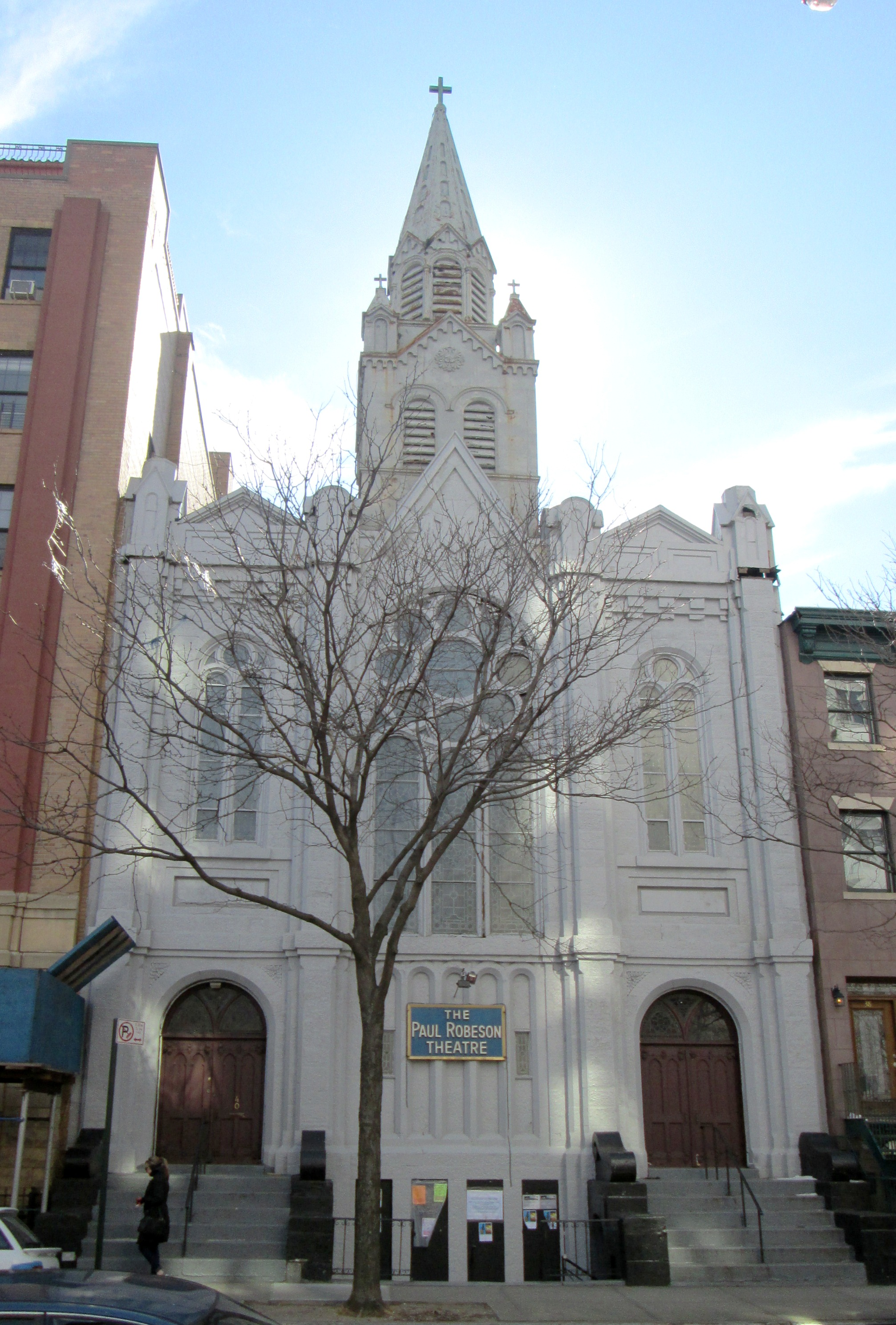
Paul Robeson Theater, formerly the Fourth Universalist Church, Fort Greene, Brooklyn (1833–34)

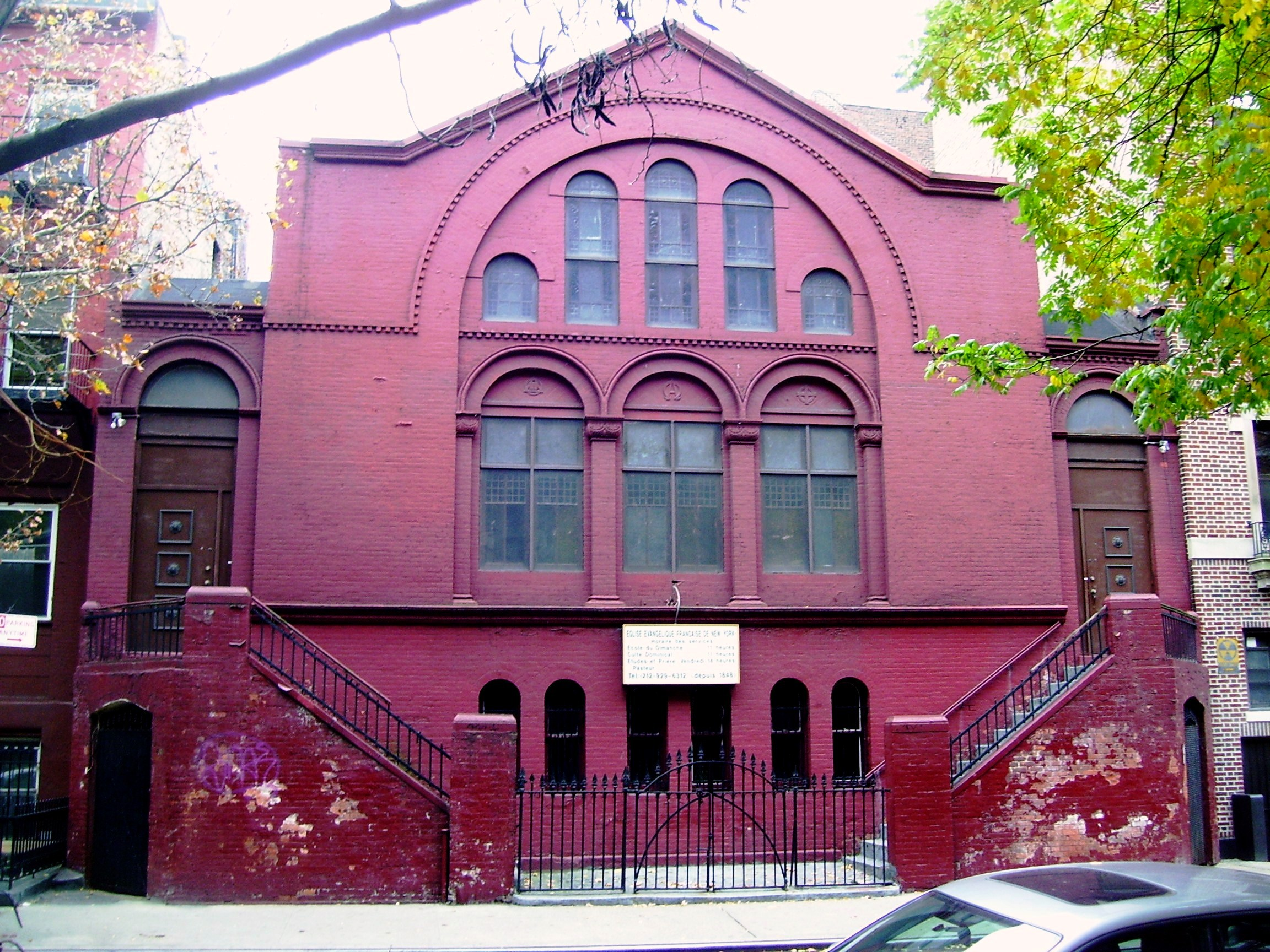
French Evangelical Church, formerly the Catholic Apostolic Church, 126 West 16th Street, Manhattan (c.1865)

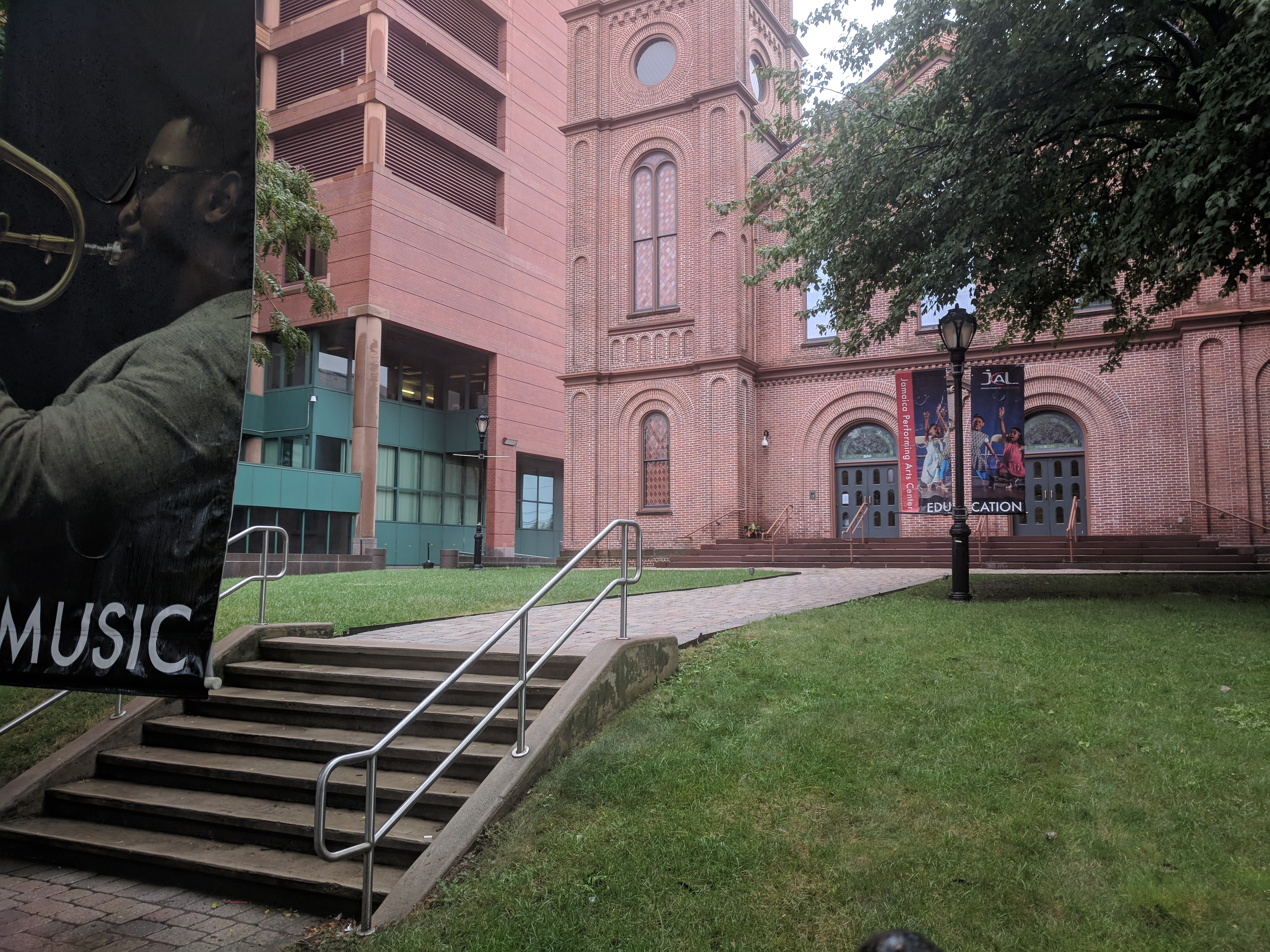
First Reformed Church, rebuilt 1859, Jamaica, Queens

== Rundbogenstil architecture in Hungary ==
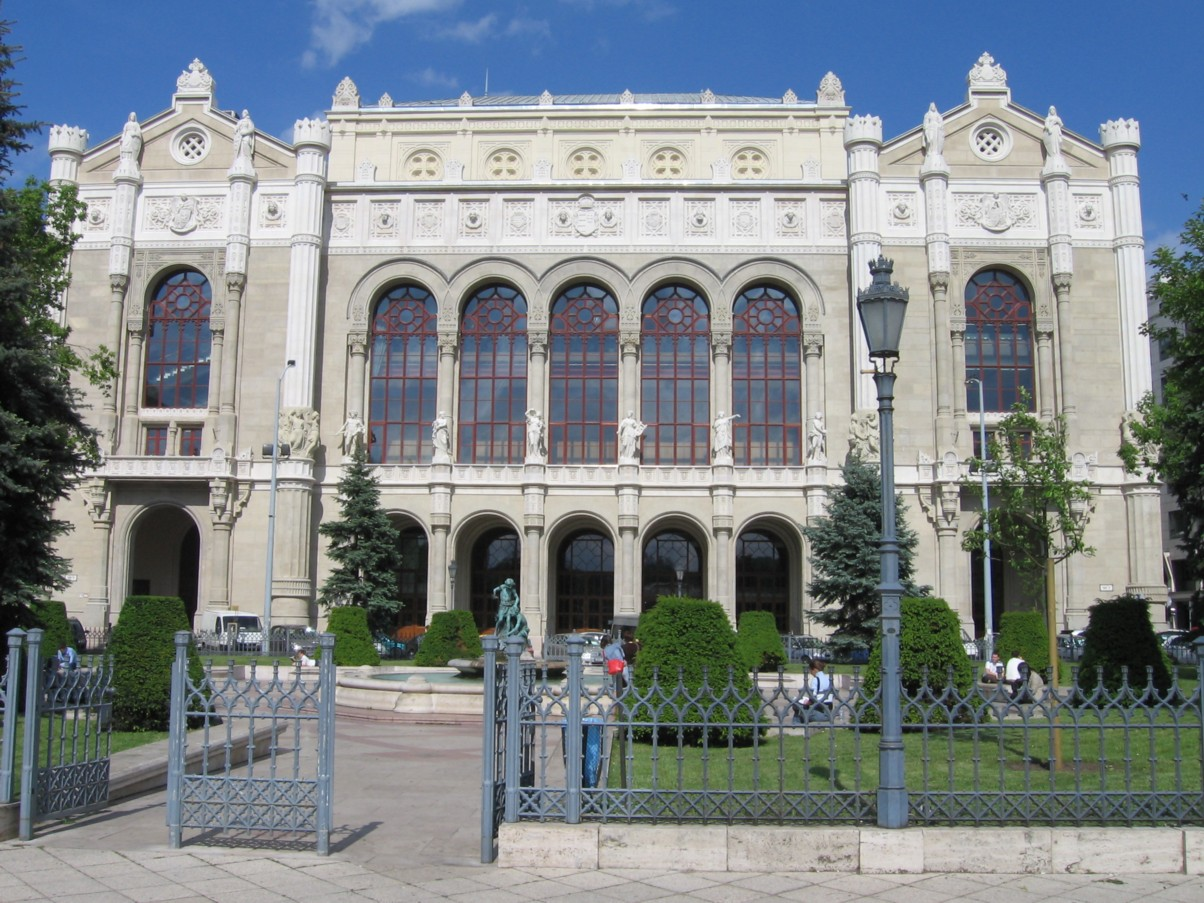
Vigadó Concert Hall, Budapest

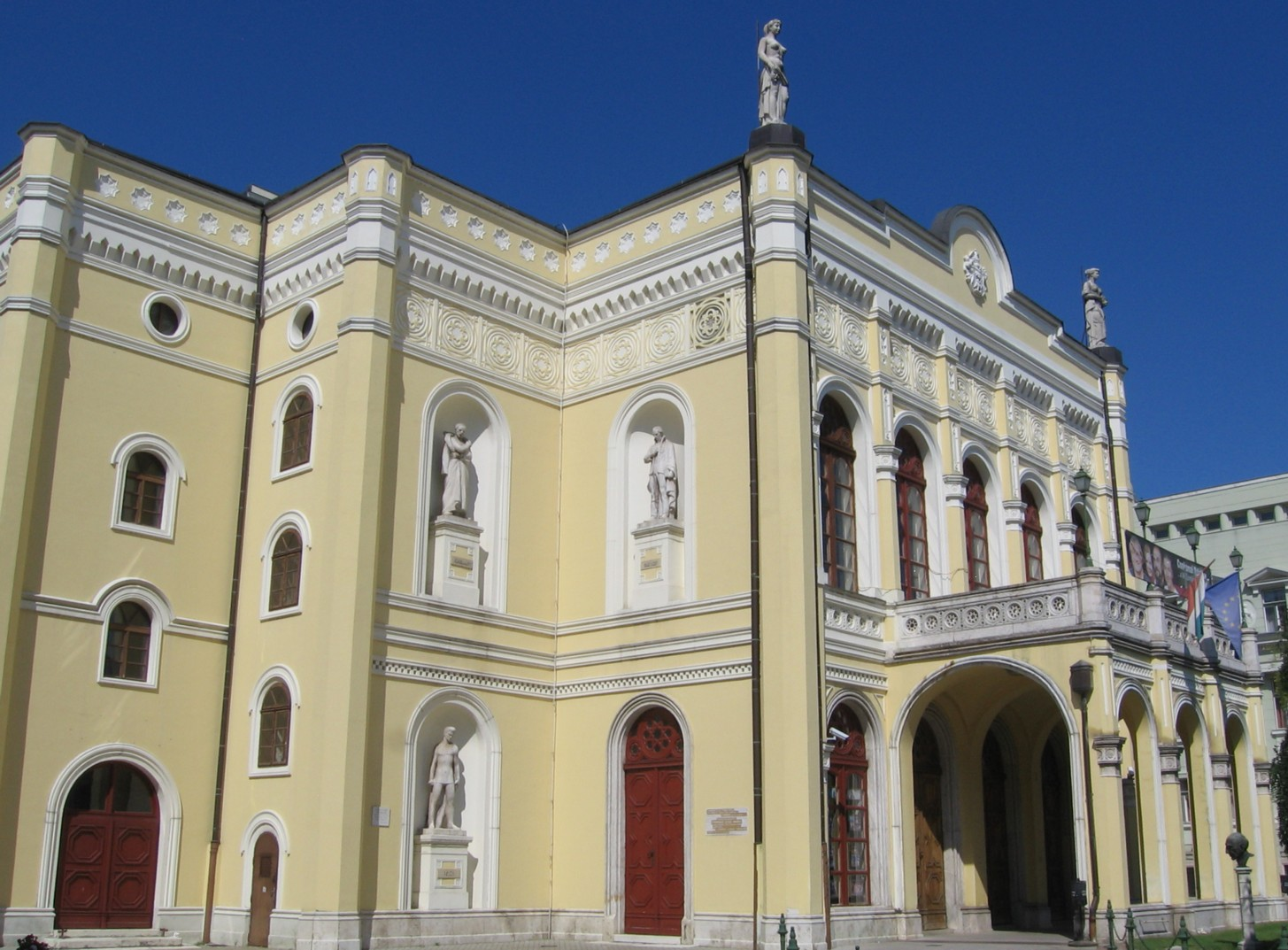
Csokonai Theatre, Debrecen

== Rundbogenstil-influenced architecture in England ==
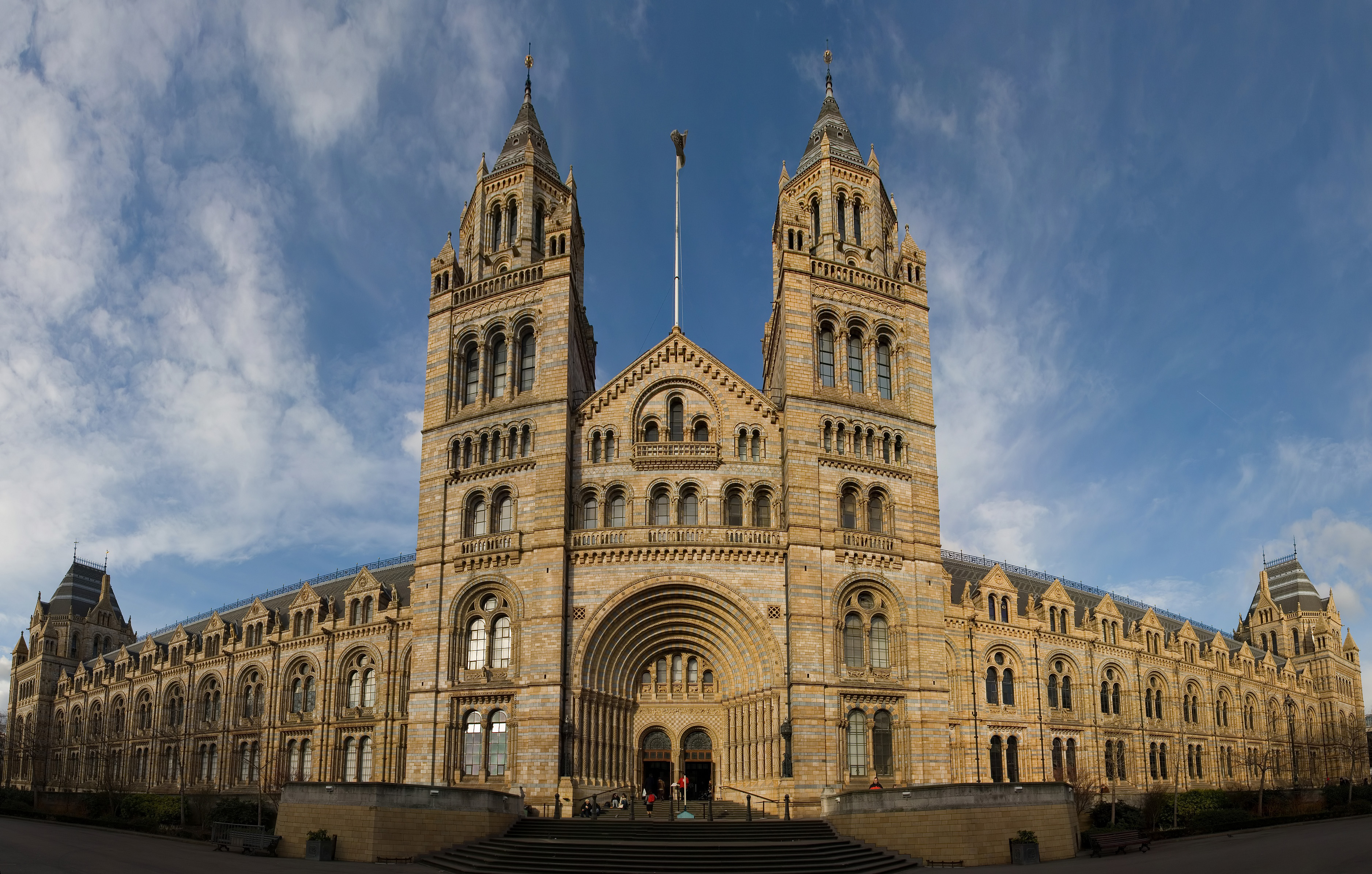
Natural History Museum, London (1864–80)

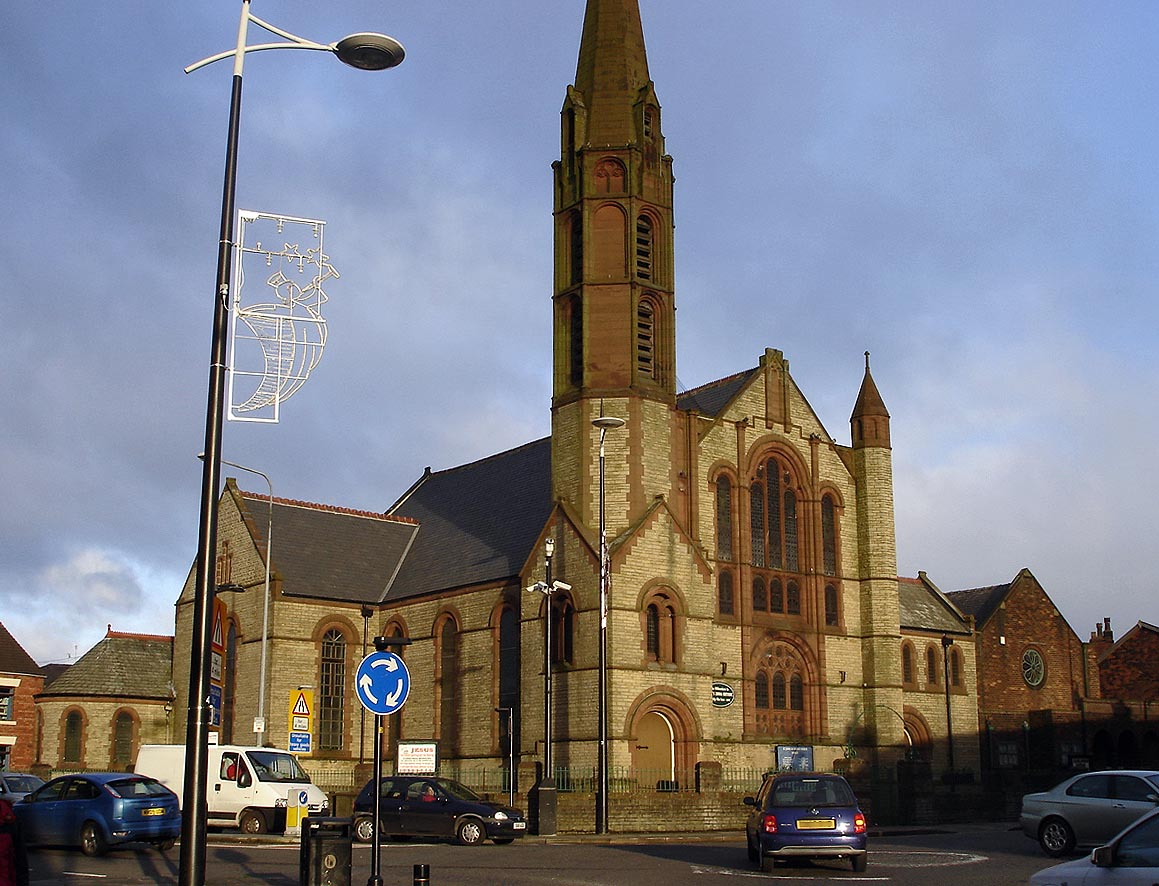
St John's Methodist Church, Hindley, Greater Manchester (1868)

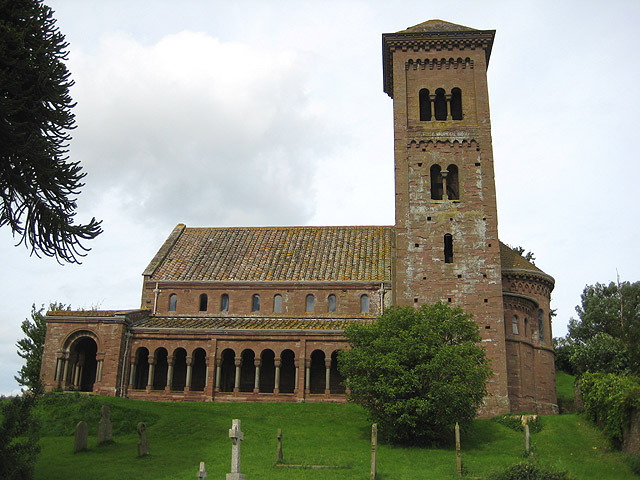
St Catherine's Church, Hoarwithy (1878–79)

== Rundbogenstil in Belgium ==
The Rundbogenstil was also widely employed in Belgium, for public buildings as well as for churches. A keen promotor of Neoclassicism and the Rundbogenstil in Belgium was architect Lodewijk Roelandt (1786–1864), who lived in the city of Ghent. Among his achievements in Rundbogenstil are St Anne's Church (Sint-Annakerk (Gent)), the riding school Arena Van Vletingen, both in Ghent, and the Onze-Lieve-Vrouw-van-Bijstand-der-Christenenkerk (Sint-Niklaas) at Sint-Niklaas.

== See also ==
- List of architectural styles
