= Autonomous stained glass =

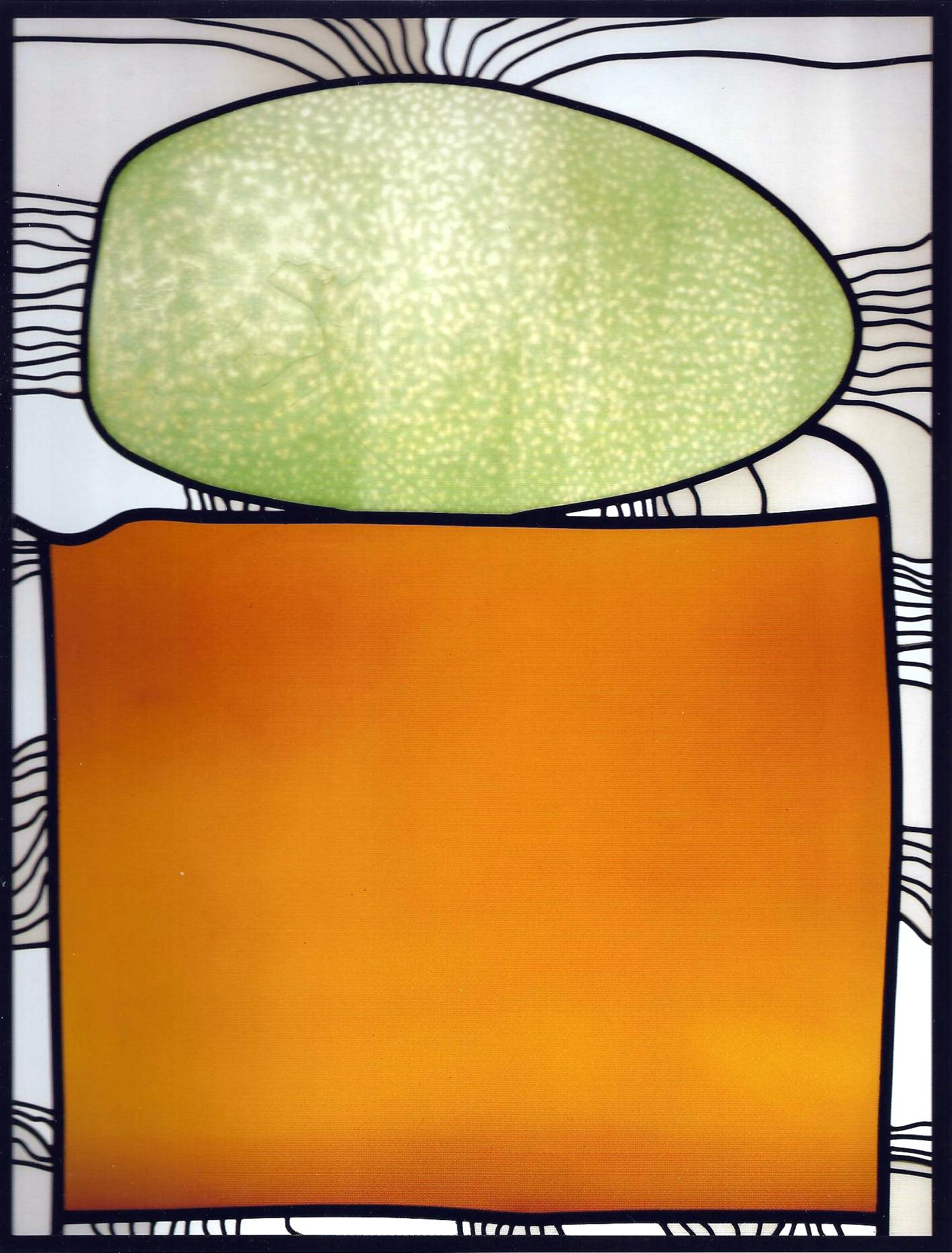
Sanford Barnett, Green Egg (1978), Corning Museum of Glass

The term "autonomous" as applied to stained glass refers to works which are designed independent of architecture. Autonomous works are not designed to glaze windows. The term "stained glass" commonly precedes "window" and is thus linked to architecture both linguistically and conceptually. The autonomous work is more like a painting than a stained glass window, and is a non-traditional use of the medium. One critic somewhat pejoratively calls non-architectural stained glass "uncommissioned panels." Another traditionalist claims: "Stained glass can never be really satisfactory when considered as a bibelot to be hung up in the window or when sold in galleries like paintings for room decoration."

From the Renaissance (Uccello, Ghiberti, Ghirlandaio), through the 18th and 19th centuries (Sir Joshua Reynolds, Delacroix), into the 20th century (Rouault, Chagall), artists have made windows in the style of their paintings. These windows look like paintings but they are windows that respond, to a greater or lesser degree, to the form, purpose, and mood of a building. Over time there have been scattered examples of works painted on small sheets of glass, sometimes assembled with lead, which were not designed to fill window openings. In Germany during the second half of the 20th century, studios began fabricating small panels for display in galleries and museums that were either similar in style to, or details of larger windows. Such panels are generally extensions of an architecturally accommodative aesthetic quite different from the "personal and introspective" approach of much contemporary painting and autonomous stained glass.

Theo van Doesburg, Piet Mondrian, Josef Albers and a handful of other early 20th-century artists did on occasion make autonomous stained glass works. Not until the early 1970s in the United States, however, did a group of stained glass artists devote themselves, in some instances exclusively, to such work. Like painters, they used the medium in expressive, personal ways, designing and executing their own work rather than having them made by outside studios as is common with architectural stained glass windows. The first generation of American artists working autonomously with stained glass was documented in the landmark 1978 exhibition "New Stained Glass" at New York's Museum of Contemporary Crafts. Subsequently, others, worldwide, have devoted themselves to making autonomous stained glass.

In the book Twentieth Century Stained Glass: A New Definition, art critic Robert Kehlmann points out that making a stained glass panel and designing a window are two different disciplines. Autonomous glass artists generally fabricate their own work, very often experimenting with materials, technique, and the uses of light. They freely "address a wide range of ideas and feelings without concern for the form and mood of a building." The size, shape and imagery of an autonomous stained glass work is "dictated solely by the nature of materials and personal aesthetics."

Autonomous Stained Glass Works

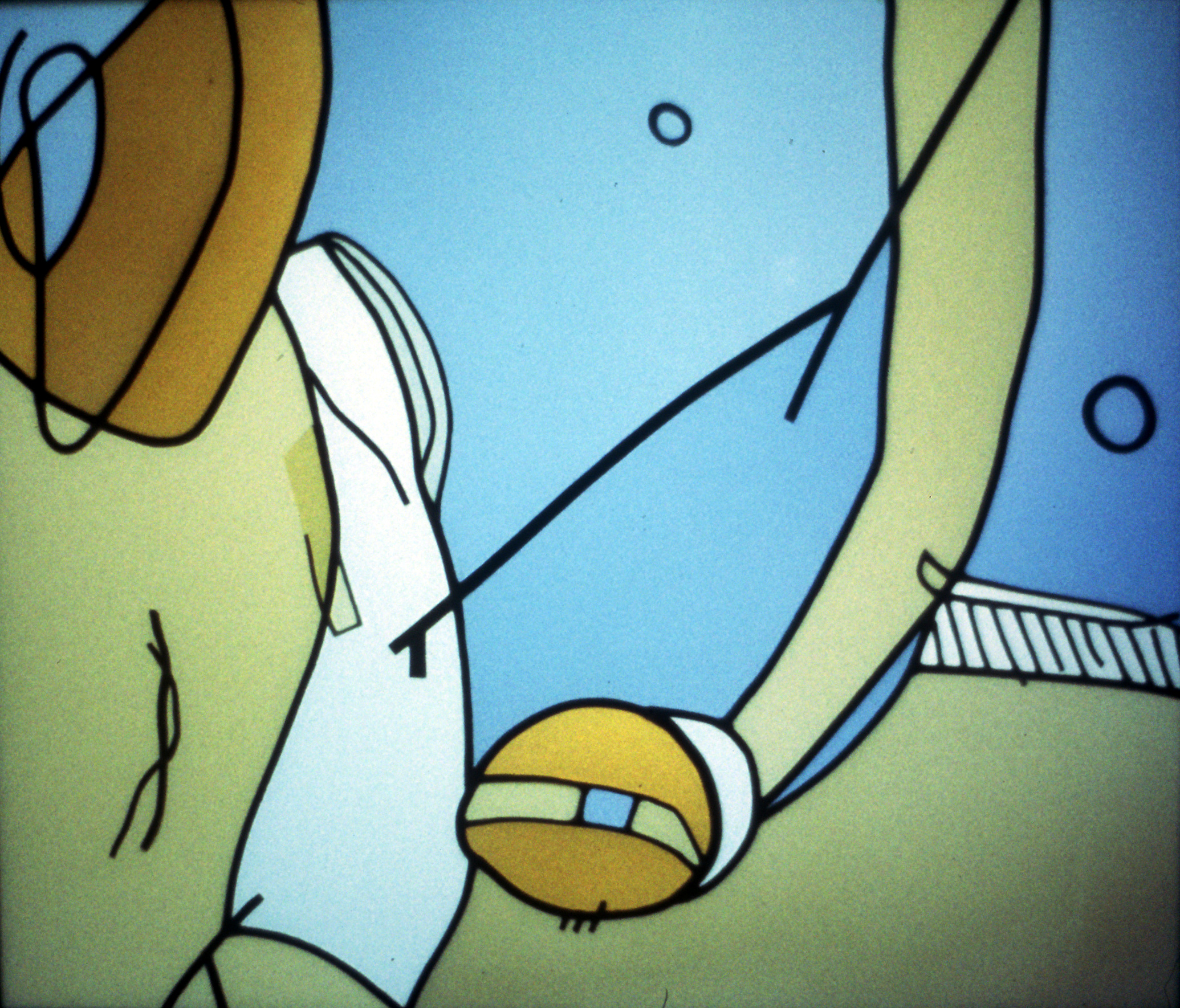
Robert Kehlmann, Composition XXXIX (1977), 33 X 38, Leigh Yawkey Woodson Art Museum, Wausau, WI

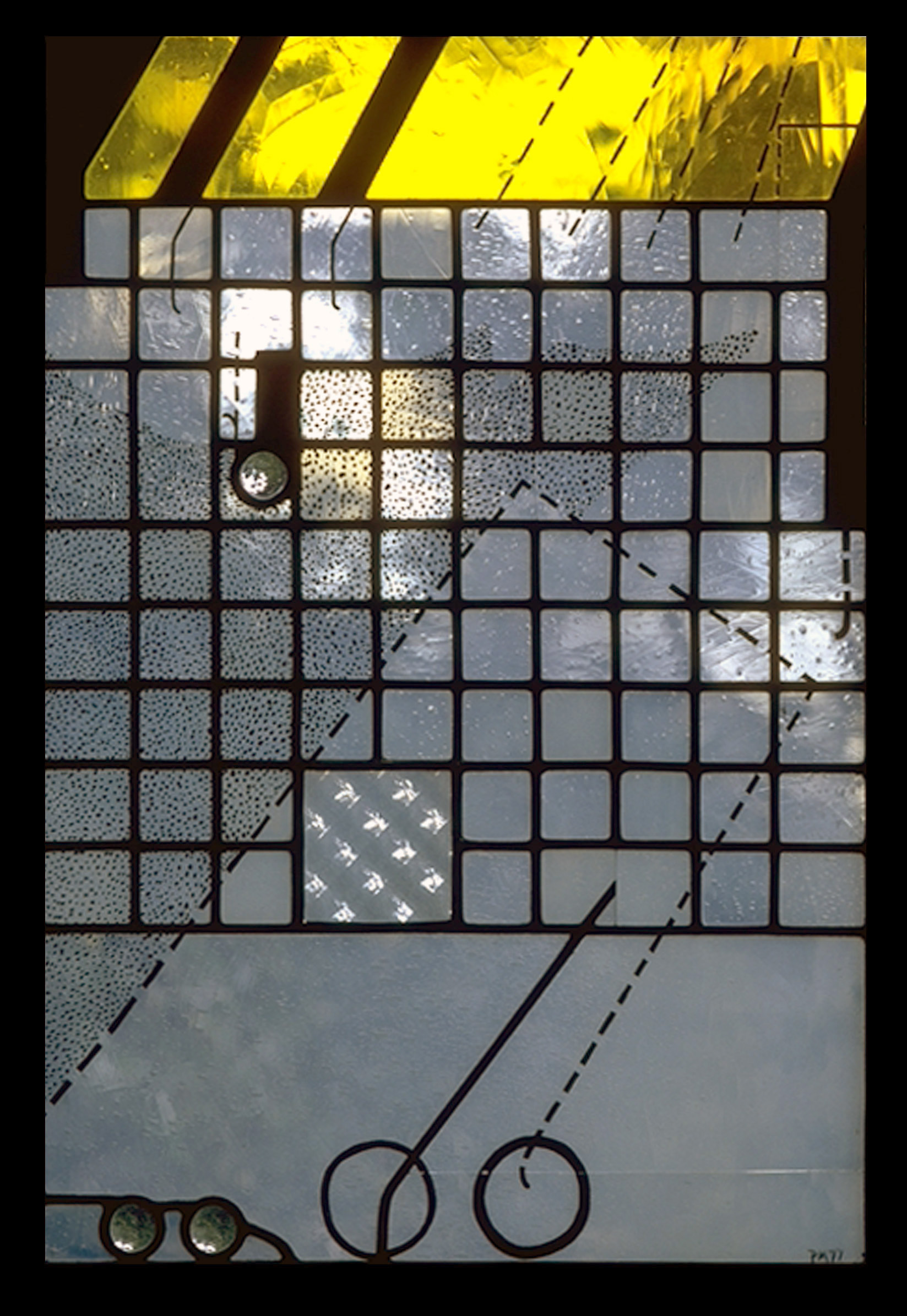
Peter Mollica, Glass Drawing 1a, (1977), destroyed

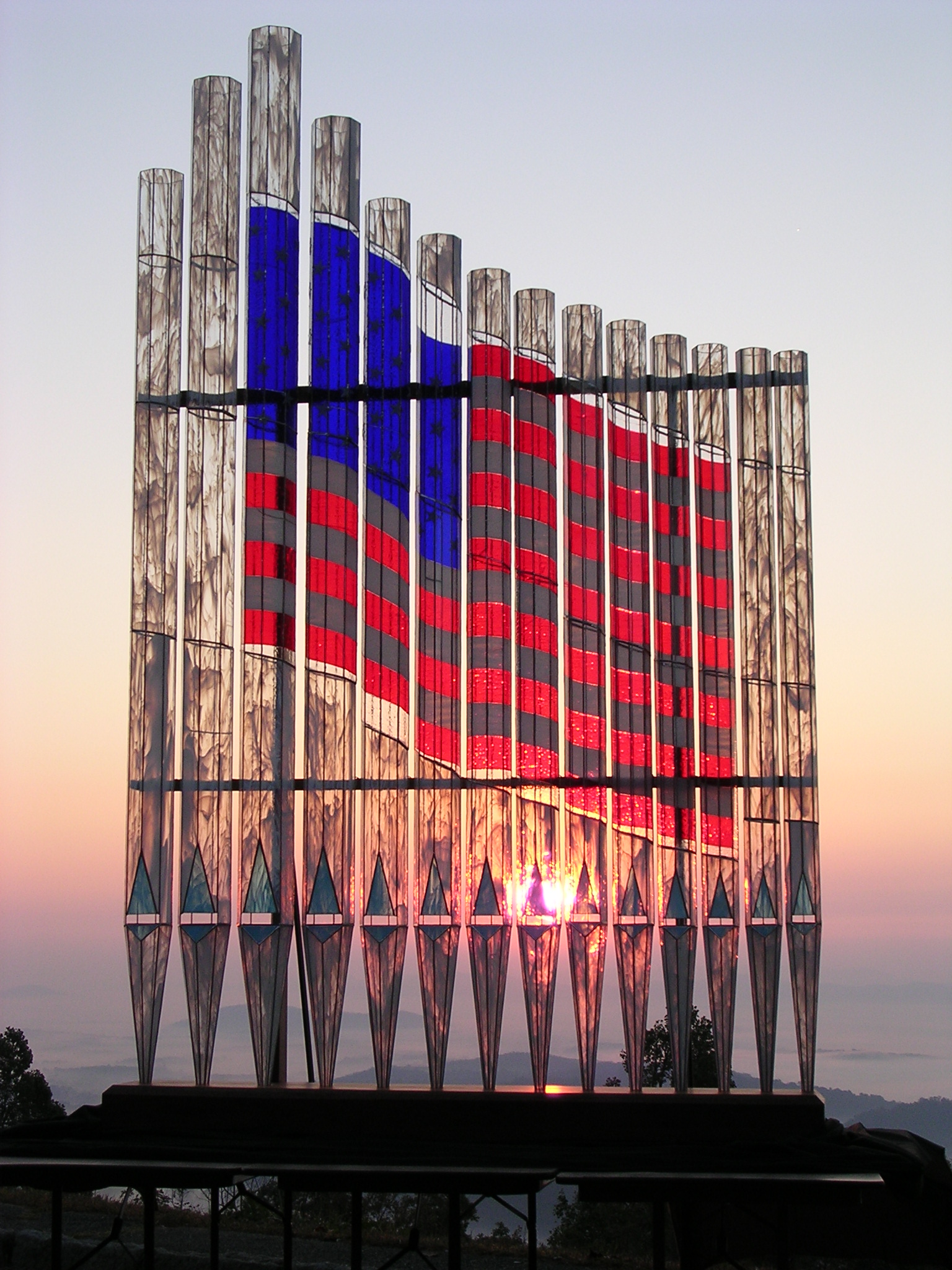
The Wilhelmy American Flag Glass Pipe Organ

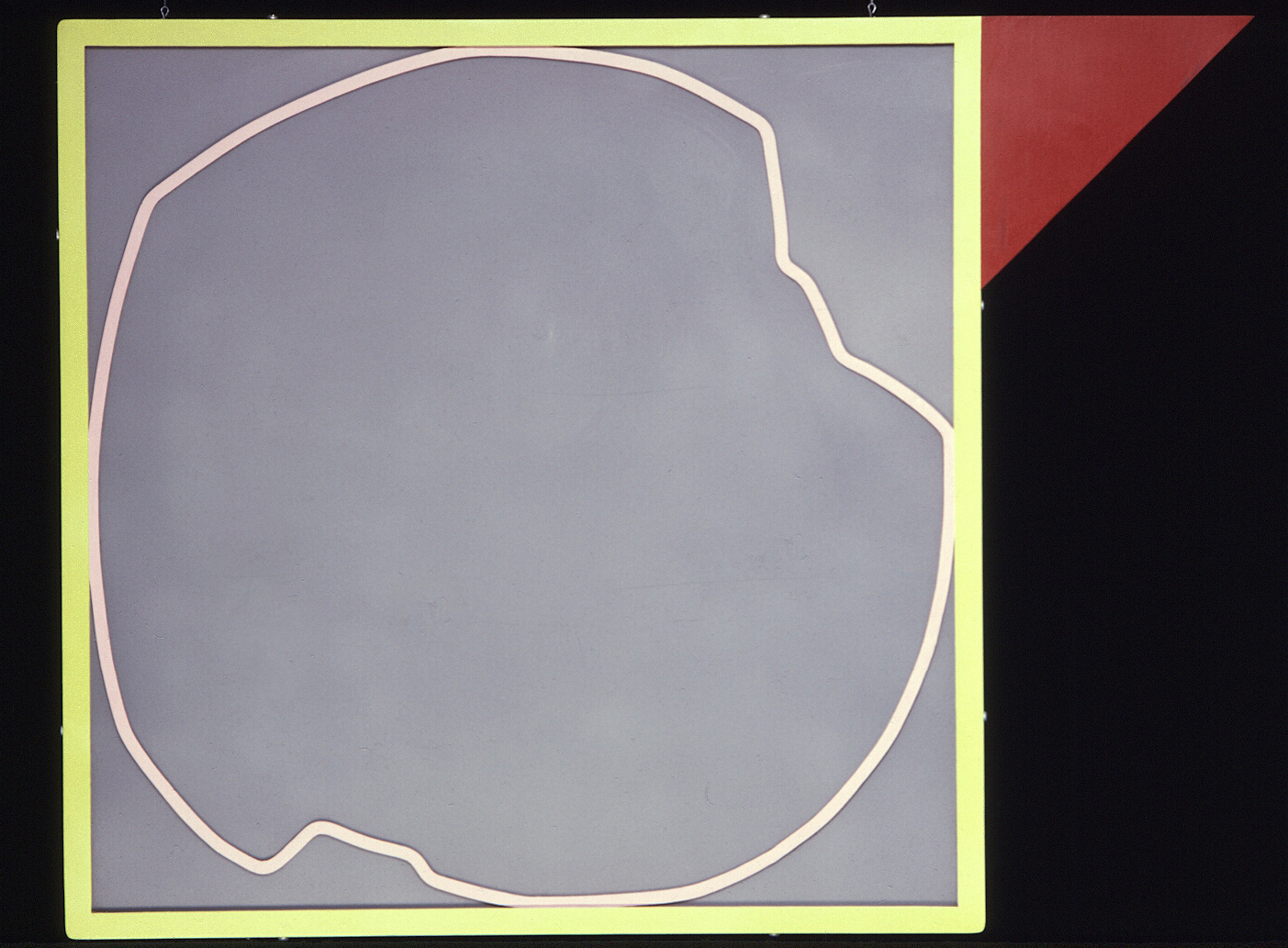
Casey Lewis, Harpo Marx (1976) 26 X 26, Corning Museum of Glass

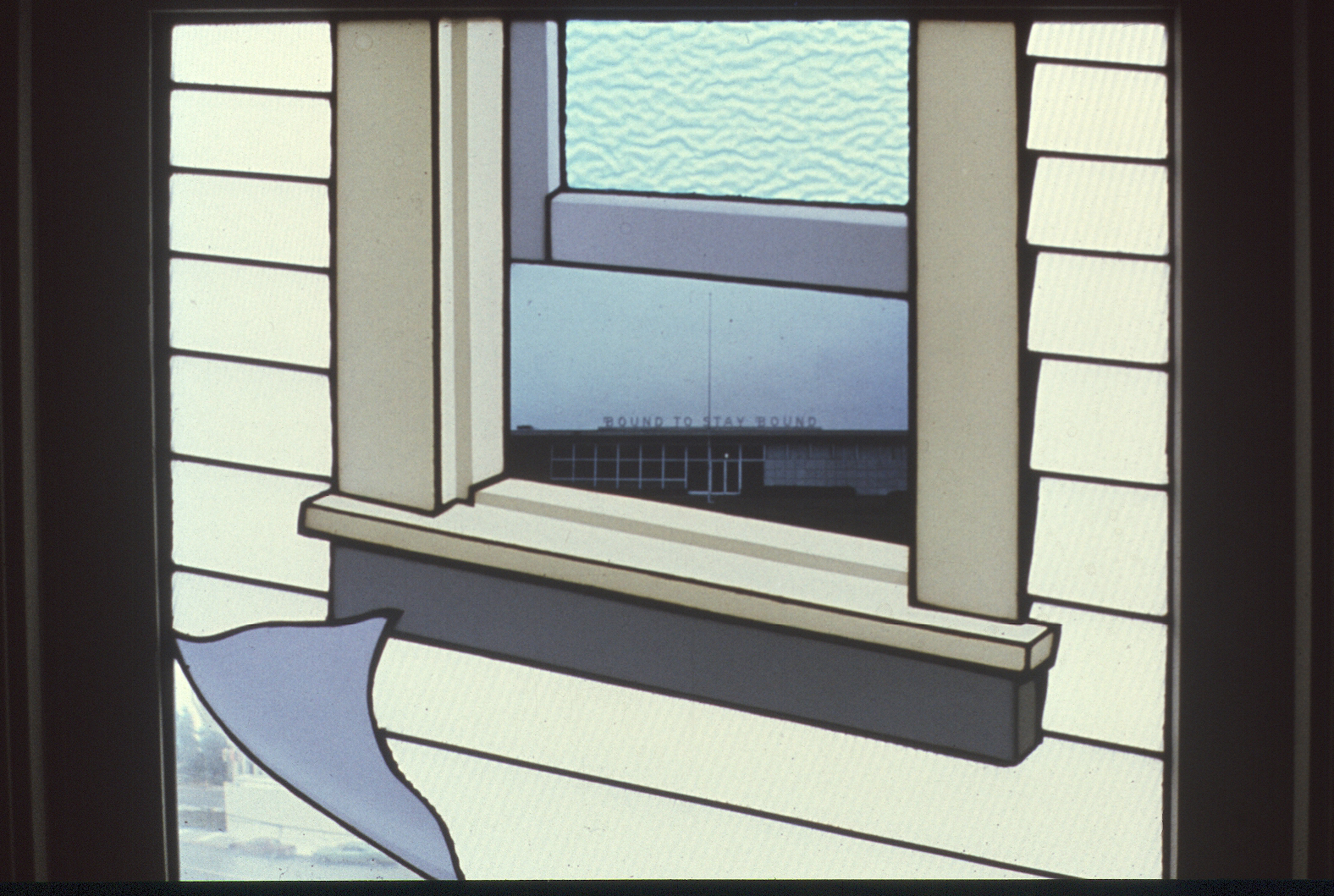
Richard Posner, Persistence of Vision (1975), Metropolitan Museum of Art
