= Robert Kehlmann =

American artist and writer

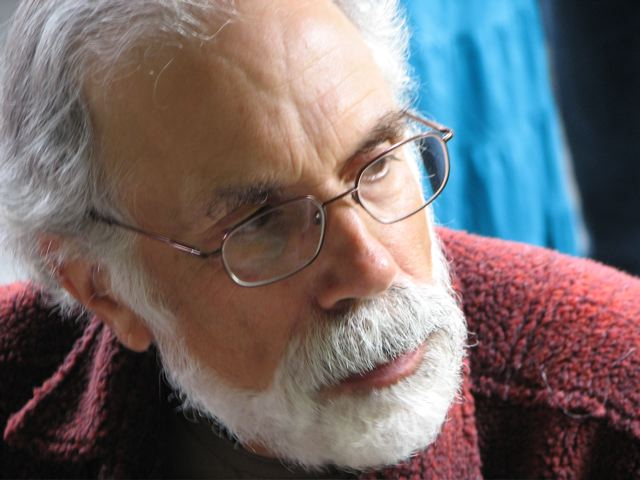
Robert Kehlmann
| Born | 1942 Brooklyn, New York |
| Nationality | American |
| Field | Artist, Art Critic |
| Education | 1963 B.A., Antioch College, Ohio (English Literature) 1966 M.A., University of California Berkeley (English Literature) |
| Awards | 1977 Craftsmen's Fellowship Grant, National Endowment for the Arts; 1978 Art Critic's Fellowship Grant, National Endowment for the Arts; 1994 Honorary Lifetime Membership, Glass Art Society; 2026 Best New Fiction, American Legacy Book Awards; 2026 Historical Fiction, Next Generation Indie Book Awards |
| Books | Twentieth Century Stained Glass: A New Definition, dual language text, Kyoto Shoin Ltd., Kyoto, Japan, 1992 The Inner Light: Sculpture by Stanislav Libenský and Jaroslava Brychtová, University of Washington Press, Seattle, 2002 The Rabbi's Suitcase, Koëhlerbooks, Virginia Beach, VA, 2025 |
| Website | official website |

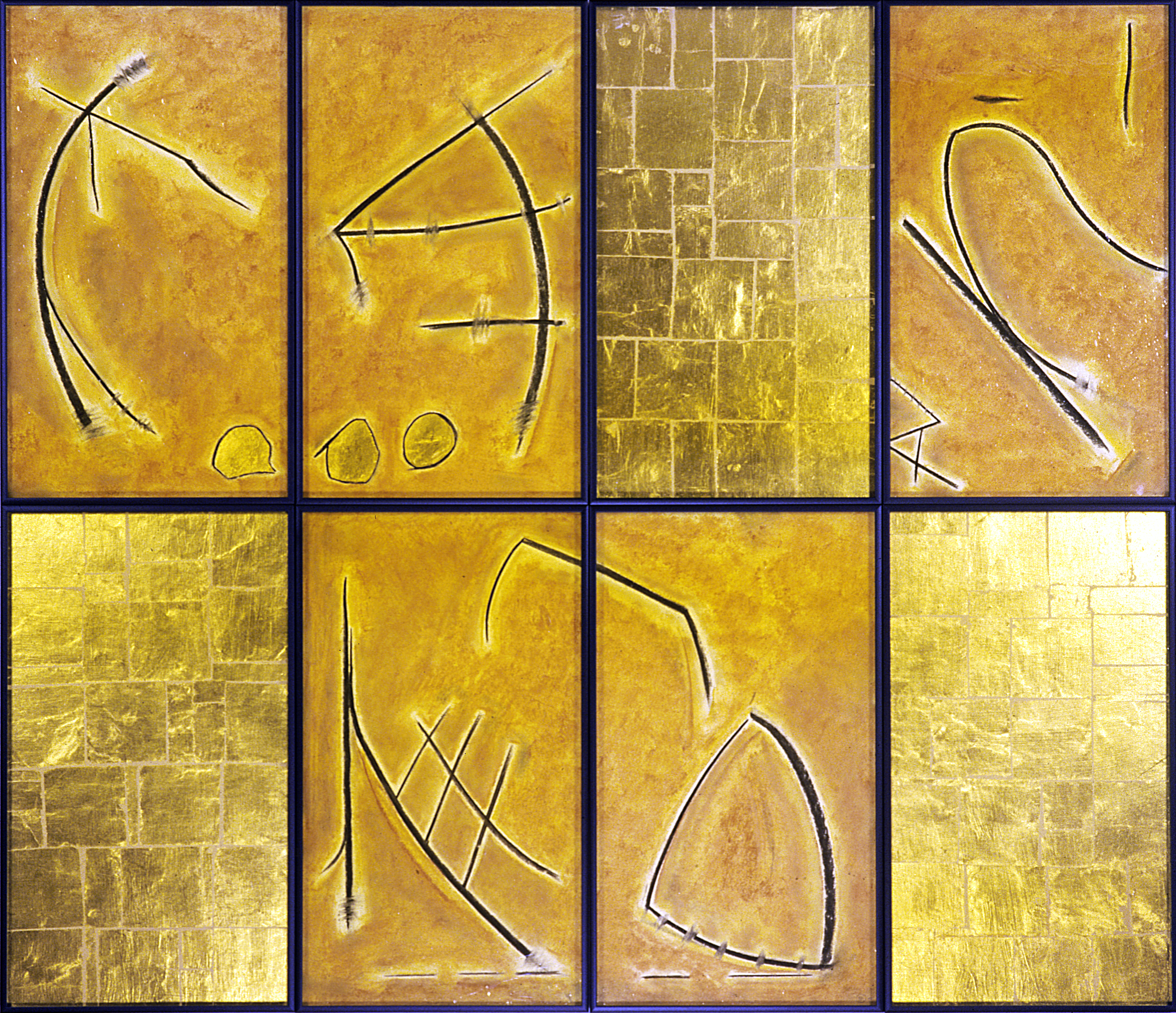
Robert Kehlmann, "Millennium Byōbu II” (2000), Four Seasons Hotel, San Francisco.

Robert Kehlmann is an artist and writer. He was an early spokesperson for evaluating glass art in the context of contemporary painting and sculpture. His glasswork has been exhibited worldwide and is the focus of numerous commentaries. Kehlmann's work can be found in museums and private collections in the United States, Europe and Asia. He has written books, articles, and exhibition reviews for publications in the U.S. and abroad. In 2014 the Rakow Research Library of The Corning Museum of Glass acquired Kehlmann's studio and research archives. In 2025 he published a debut novel, “The Rabbi’s Suitcase.”

== Biography ==
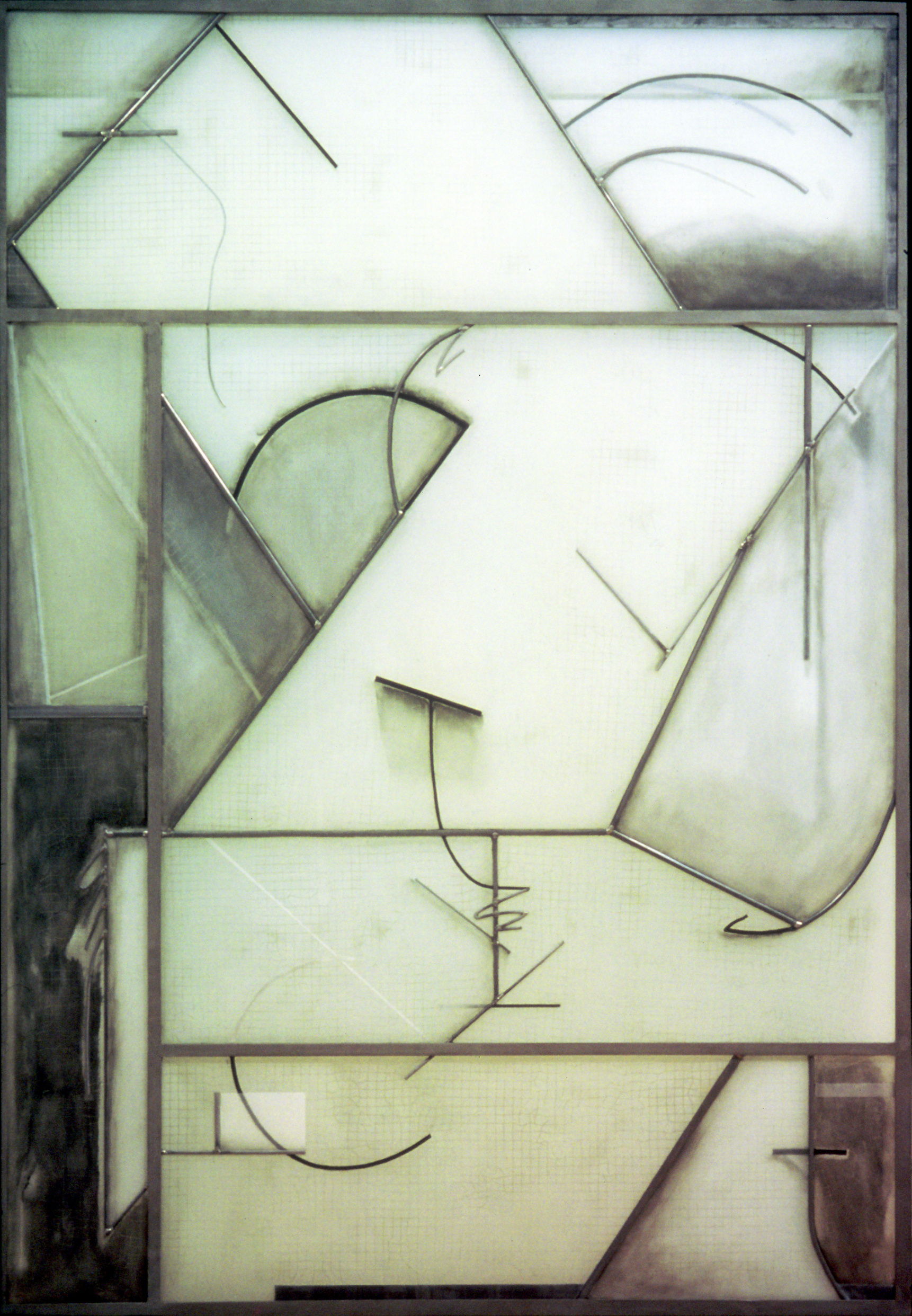
Robert Kehlmann, “Quartet” (1979) Private Collection, San Francisco.

Part of a group of California artists making leaded glass panels in the early 1970s, Kehlmann emerged as a key figure in the development of contemporary American stained glass. Formally trained in literary criticism he was self-taught as an artist. His leaded works, called “Compositions,” together with later mixed media pieces and mosaics, have been described as symbolic, subjective narratives, rendered in a “painterly tradition.” As an art critic he was a theorist and spokesperson for the contemporary glass movement in the later part of the 20th century.

Kehlmann received National Endowment for the Arts fellowships for his work as both an artist and critic. He has written two books about glass, and articles and exhibition reviews by him have appeared in periodicals in the U.S. and abroad. Kehlmann has taught at the Pilchuck Glass School, the California College of the Arts, and the Miasa Bunka Center in Nagano City, Japan. He has lectured and given workshops at many institutions including the Renwick Gallery, the Corning Museum of Glass, the Victoria and Albert Museum, the Honolulu Academy of Arts and the Rhode Island School of Design. Kehlmann has juried and curated numerous exhibitions including a retrospective of work by Czech sculptors Stanislav Libenský and Jaroslava Brychtová. He has served on the board of directors of the Glass Art Society (1980–84, 1989–92) and edited the Glass Art Society Journal (1981–1984).

A former Chairman of Berkeley's Landmark’s Preservation Commission (1997–1999), he founded the Berkeley Historical Plaque Project in 1997. His debut novel, The Rabbi’s Suitcase, was published in 2025. A 1,000 page early draft together with his notes and research materials for the novel, are housed in the archives of the YIVO Institute of Jewish Research in New York. Kehlmann has lived and worked in Berkeley California since 1963. His wife, Diana Tosto Kehlmann, is a Jin Shin Jitsu practitioner and a homeopath. Their son, Ephraim, is a digital media producer living in New York City.

== Leaded Glass Drawings ==
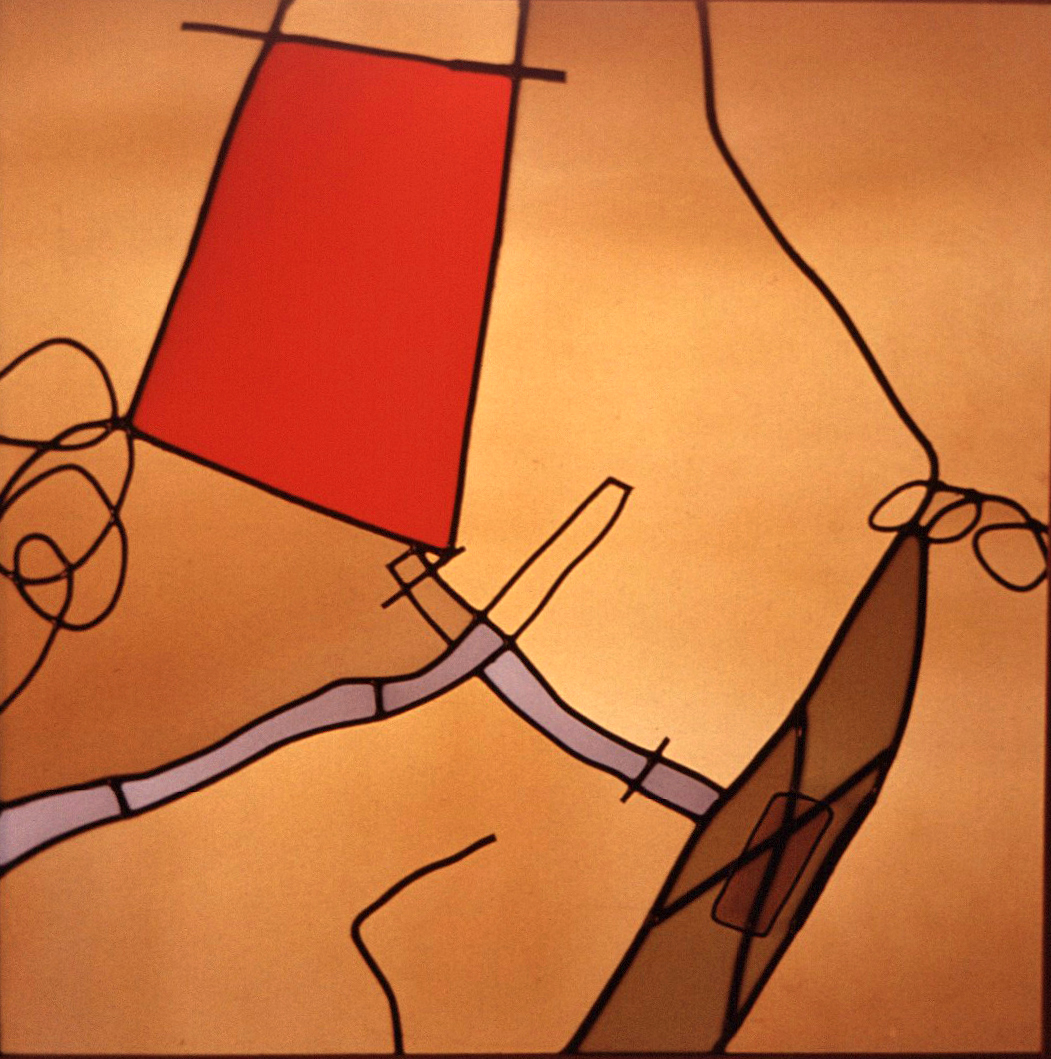
Robert Kehlmann, “Composition XXVIII” (1976), Museum für Zeitgenössische Glasmalerei, Langen, Germany.

After receiving his master's degree in English literature, Kehlmann traveled in Europe (1969–70) where he developed an interest in art. He used the tools of literary criticism to help his understanding: “From the start I felt there was little difference in the experience of reading a poem and that of looking at a painting.”

Kehlmann's early “Compositions” are made with traditional lead came and colored glass. Glass forms protrude from the background surface, whimsically frolicking with and redefining underlying blocks of color and lead scribbles. Explaining the absence of transparent glass in these works, he wrote: “I don’t want people looking through my windows. What lies behind the compositions, aside from a source of light, has no relevance to my design.” Kehlmann rejected the medium's seductive colors and Tiffany-like approach “plagued” by “small multi-colored pieces of glass,” insisting that the artist has “greater control” with fewer colors and fewer pieces of glass.

His leaded “Compositions” are more akin to paintings or drawings than to traditional stained glass. They have been described as narratives at once “spontaneous, lyric, grotesque and humorous.” Biomorphic forms, quirky lines and childlike scribbles, at times derived from his son's crayon drawings, add to the surreal atmosphere. A crossed-out triangle in one of the works “appears a casual enough gesture, but the assumption of nearly a thousand years of stained glass, that the nature of line is to delineate shape, is challenged by that childlike scrawl.” These Compositions “quietly demolished more than a few of the restrictive preconceptions surrounding his media.”

== Sandblasted works ==
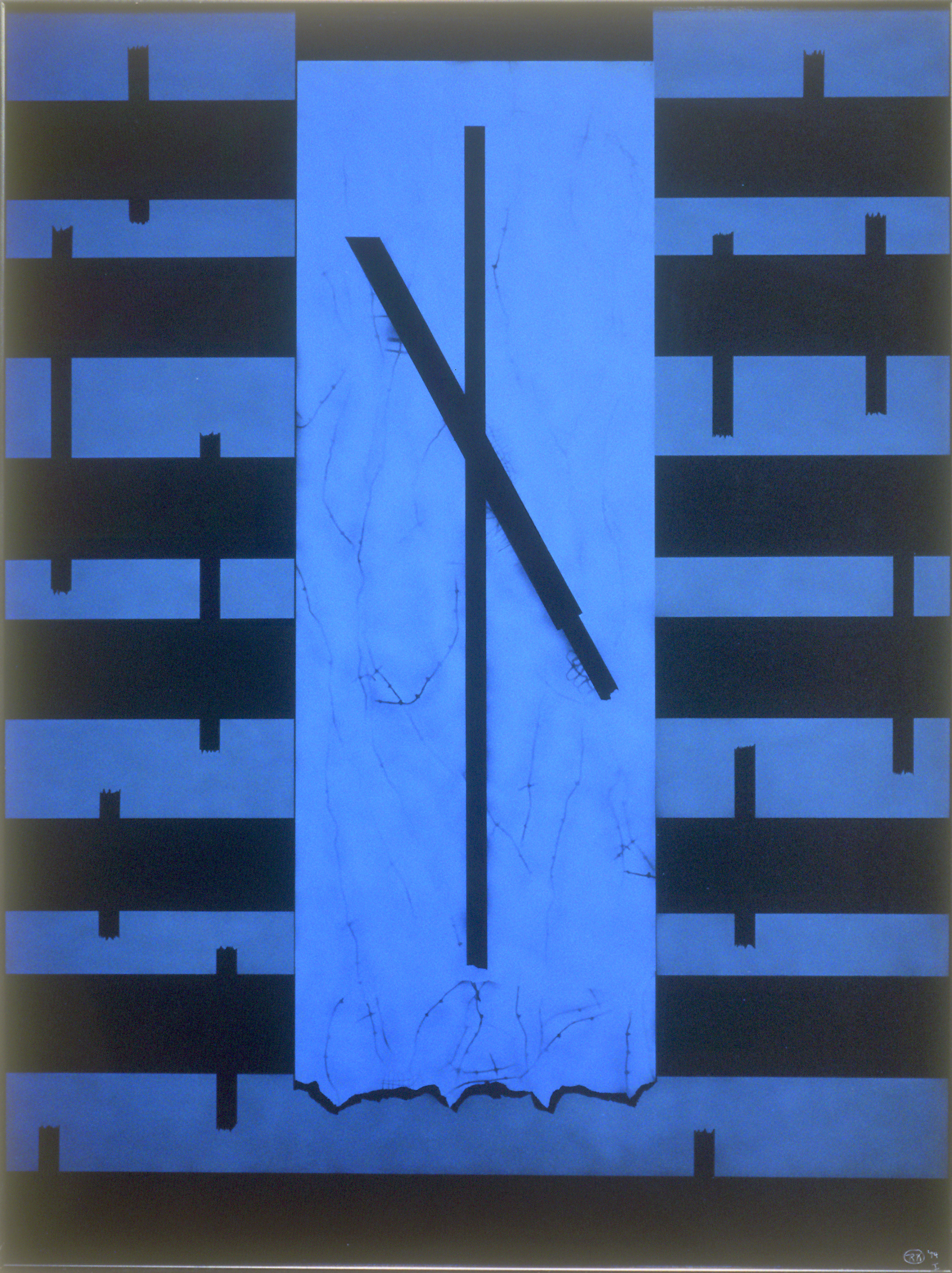
Robert Kehlmann, “Stations of the Cross I: Christ Condemned” (1995), Saint Mary's College of California, Moraga, CA.

In the late ‘70s Kehlmann began using sandblast on sheets of hand-blown glass to make “nuanced monochromes” which glow with inner-light trapped in their surfaces. Perhaps in response to his brother's untimely death in 1982, the exuberance of the early leaded compositions gives way to introspection in two major series: Tablets (1981) and The Stations of the Cross (1982–1995).

In the mid-1980s Kehlmann began using brass and copper etching on the surface of the glass, and charcoal drawings on board behind the glass, to express “free-associative states of mind.” During a 1984 interview, the late art critic Clement Greenberg singled out Kehlmann's work as taking the “first steps” toward “major art” in “two-dimensional, pictorial” glass.

Kehlmann's mid-career sandblasted works encourage the viewer to enter the depth of the works together with the light. Within layered pieces of glass, or spaces between the glass and underlying drawing, lines and shadows mix with light. The inner-spaces create changing kinetic pattern and movement as the viewer moves or the light changes.

After traveling in Japan and teaching at the Miasa Bunka center in Nagano City Japan in 1985, the influence of Japanese esthetics and calligraphy emerges prominently in Kehlmann's work. His pieces of the 1990s and beyond have been called “quiet abstract meditations” making references to the Bible, Buddhism, the natural landscape and Japanese calligraphy.

Kehlmann's “Zen graffiti or Americanized calligraphy,” a mix of bold charcoal gestures and anxious strokes, at times combines with broad areas of gold leaf in the style of the Japanese byōbu. Other works of the ‘90s were inspired by the northern California coast with light from ripples and bubbles in the hand-blown glass evoking the surface of water, tide pools, and underwater shadows. They are “characterized by the sensual, measured quality of tender, vulnerable drawn lines in an uncertain planar space.”

== Mosaic and Collage ==
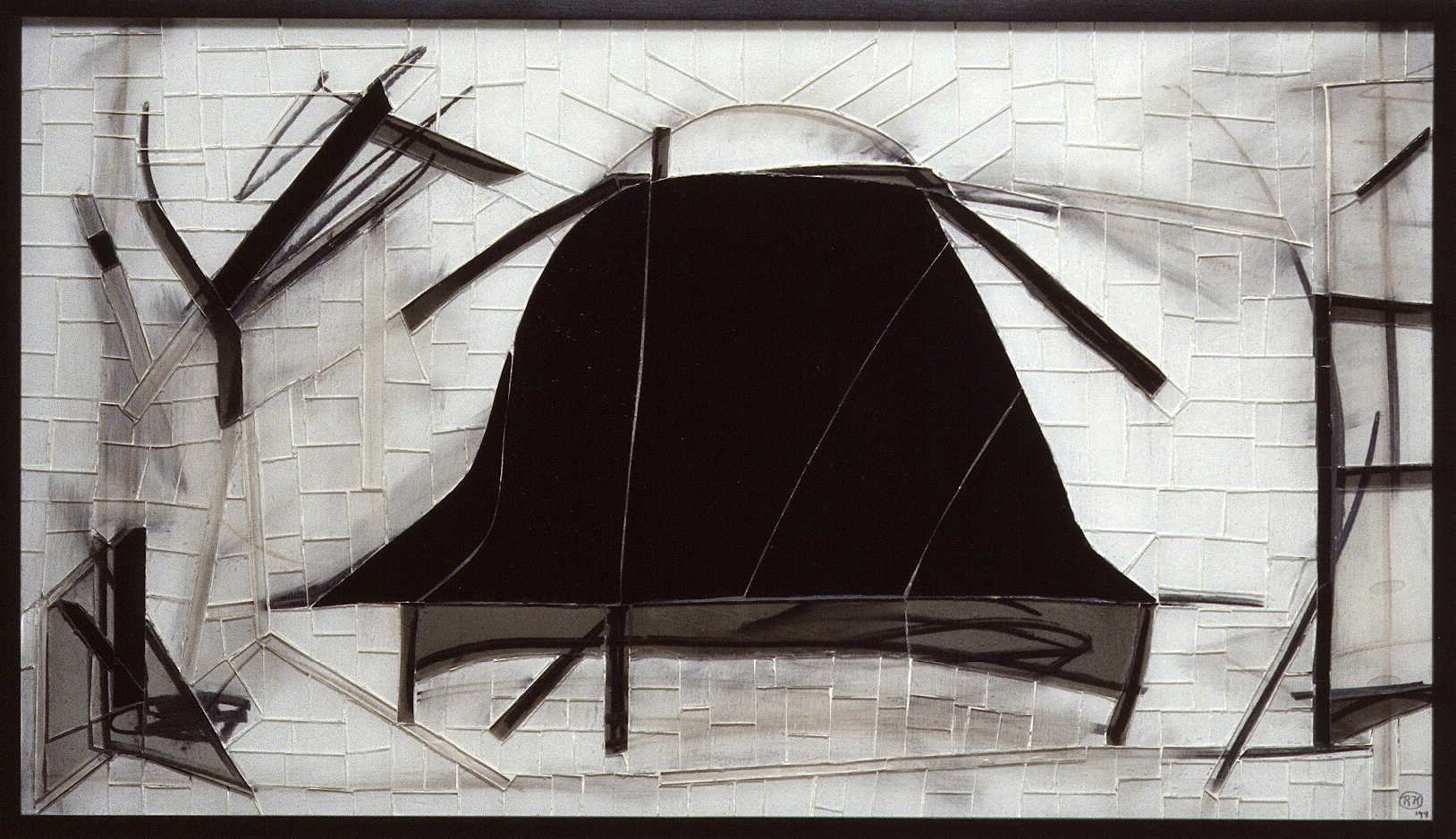
Robert Kehlmann, "Piano" (1994), Corning Museum of Glass.

In his mosaics, as in the sandblasted works, Kehlmann superimposes glass over an underlying drawing. Irregular spaces between individually hand-cut tesserae and larger abstract glass forms assume a graphic role. They cast shadows that lead the eye of the viewer back and forth between the glass surface and the drawing behind it. The expressive mixed-media collages, containing autobiographical snippets (museum and opera ticket stubs, entries from his father's address cards, fragments of notated travel maps, etc.) are his most personal works.

== Select Public Collections ==
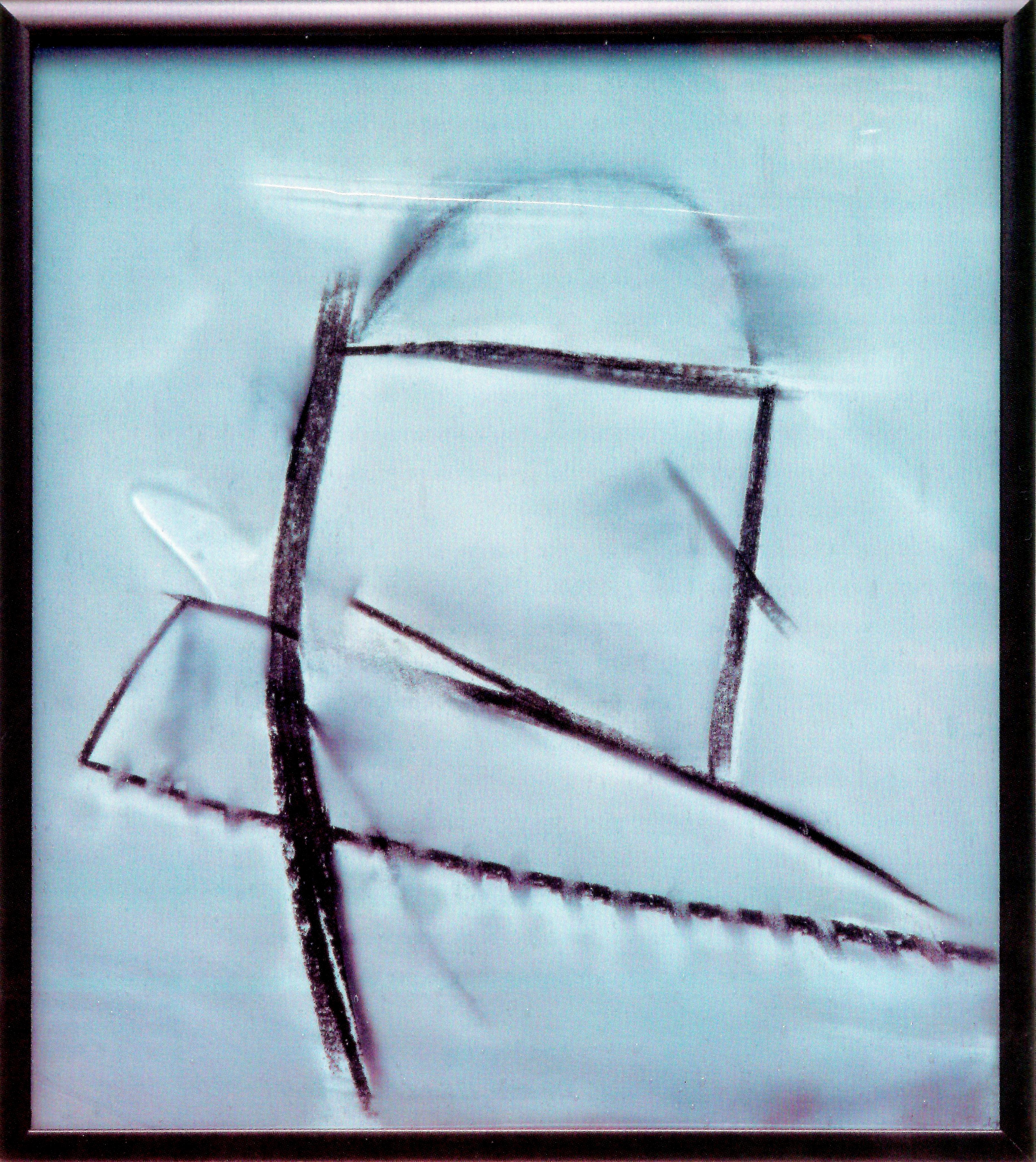
Robert Kehlmann, "Palimpsest III" (1992), Private Collection, Walnut Creek, CA.

- Bank of America World Headquarters, San Francisco, California
- Corning Museum of Glass, Corning, New York
- Four Seasons Hotel, San Francisco, CA
- Glass Museum, Centro de Arte Vitro, Monterrey, Mexico
- Hessisches Landesmuseum, Darmstadt, Germany
- Hokkaido Museum of Modern Art, Sapporo, Japan
- Huntington Museum of Art, Huntington, West Virginia
- International Alcorcon Museo dei Vidreo, Madrid, Spain
- International Glass Museum, Ebeltoft, Denmark
- Leigh Yawkey Woodson Art Museum, Wausau, Wisconsin
- Lincoln Square Residential Lobby (111 W. 67th St.), New York City
- Musée des Arts Décoratifs de la Ville de Lausanne, Switzerland
- Museum für Zeitgenössische Glasmalerei, Langen, Germany
- Museum of Arts and Design, New York
- Oakland Museum, Oakland CA
- Pilchuck School, Stanwood, Washington
- Saint Mary's College, Moraga, CA
- Smithsonian American Art Museum, Washington, D.C.
- Süssmuth-Mitarbeiter-Stiftung Glas-Museum, Immenhausen, Germany
- Toledo Museum of Art, Toledo, Ohio

== Notable exhibitions ==
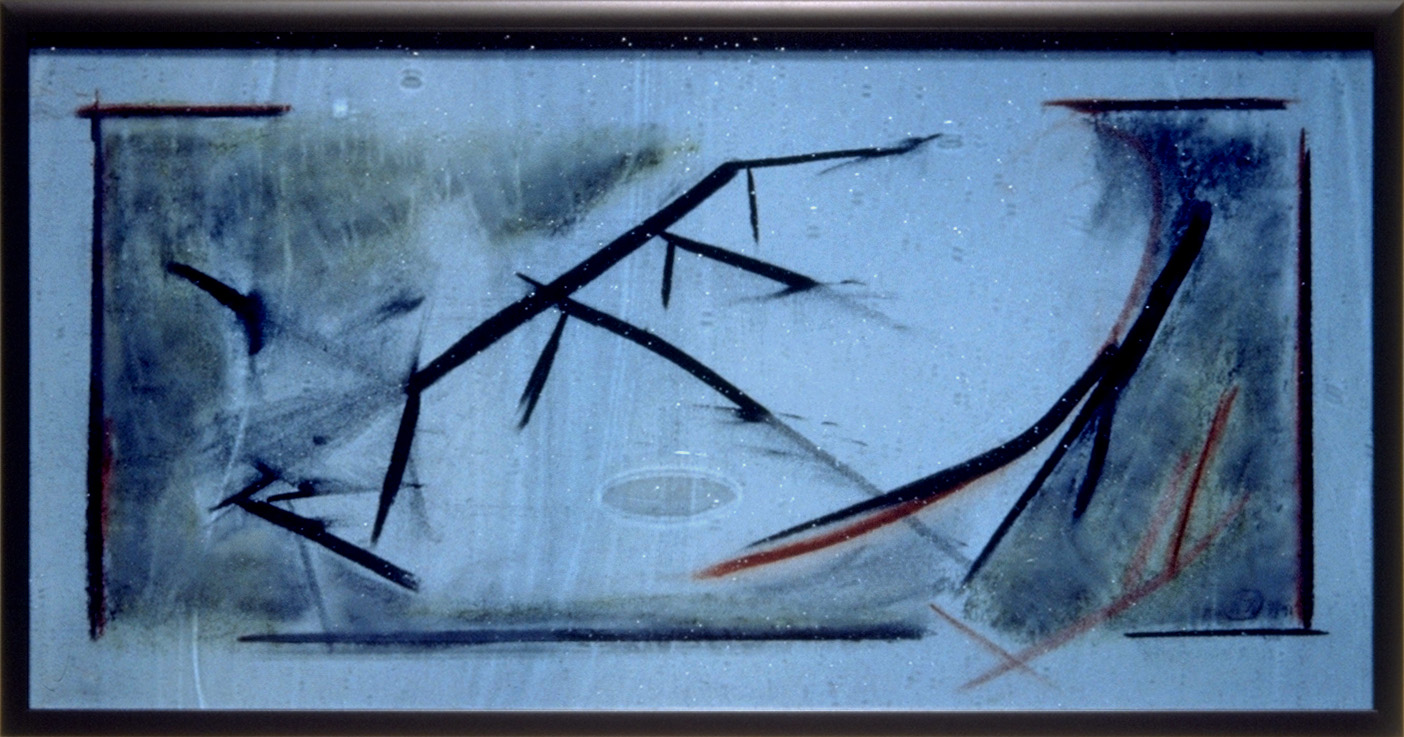
Robert Kehlmann, "Drake's Estero I" (1991), Museo del Vidria, Monterrey, Mexico.

- 1976: “Robert Kehlmann: Stained Glass Compositions,” Richmond Art Center, Richmond CA.
- 1978: “New Stained Glass,” Museum of Contemporary Crafts, New York (catalog).
- 1978: “Robert Kehlmann: Lead and Glass Drawings,” William Sawyer Gallery, San Francisco, CA.
- 1979: “New Glass,” Corning Museum of Glass, Corning, NY (catalog).
- 1982: “Robert Kehlmann: Works on Glass,” William Sawyer Gallery, San Francisco, CA.
- 1982: “World Glass Now ’82,” Hokkaido Museum of Modern Art, Sapporo, Japan (catalog)
- 1983: “Sculptural Glass,” Tucson Museum of Art, Tucson, Arizona. “Stations of the Cross” a series of fourteen sandblasted glass panels exhibited (catalog).
- 1985: “Robert Kehlmann, Neue Glasmalerei,” Galerie M, Kassel and Galerie L, Hamburg, Germany.
- 1986: “Robert Kehlmann: New Works with Glass,” William Sawyer Gallery, San Francisco, CA.
- 1988, 1990: “Robert Kehlmann,” Anne O’Brien Gallery, Washington, DC.
- 1993: “Robert Kehlmann: Drawings with Glass,” Dorothy Weiss Gallery, San Francisco, CA.
- 1996: “Robert Kehlmann, Painting with Glass: A Retrospective,” Hearst Art Gallery, Saint Mary's College of California, Moraga, CA. (catalog).

== Art Criticism ==
As author and curator, Kehlmann became the unofficial theoretician for innovative, non-traditional work in stained glass. He praised American artists who were forging technical and esthetic innovation while exploring glass as an “autonomous” (as distinct from architectural) medium. A friendly rivalry developed with Robert Sowers, the dean of American stained glass criticism, who argued that stained glass, from its origins, was first and foremost an architectural art. With articles like “Stained Glass as a Non-Architectural Art,” and “Glass as a Free Art Form,” Kehlmann questioned this assumption. He focused attention on non-architectural stained glass being done by artists like himself who designed and fabricated independent panels during the 1970s and 1980s: Sanford Barnett, Casey Lewis, Paul Marioni, Peter Mollica, Richard Posner and Narcissus Quagliata.

In later writings Kehlmann follows in the footsteps of artist-critic Robert Sowers by developing a new contemporary stained glass aesthetic. Twentieth Century Stained Glass: a New Definition presents an overview of the medium focusing on different 20th Century trends, how they influenced one another, and how they were influenced by other media.

The Inner Light: Sculpture by Stanislav Libenský and Jaroslava Brychtová, a monograph published in conjunction with the 2002 inaugural exhibition of Tacoma's Museum of Glass, analyzes the artists’ work in the context of Czech Cubism. Kehlmann's interviews with the artists, which took place shortly before Libenský's death, movingly refer to works cast at the time the artist discovered he had terminal cancer.

As editor of the Glass Art Society Journal, in 1981 Kehlmann founded a journal that continues in publication.

== Writer ==
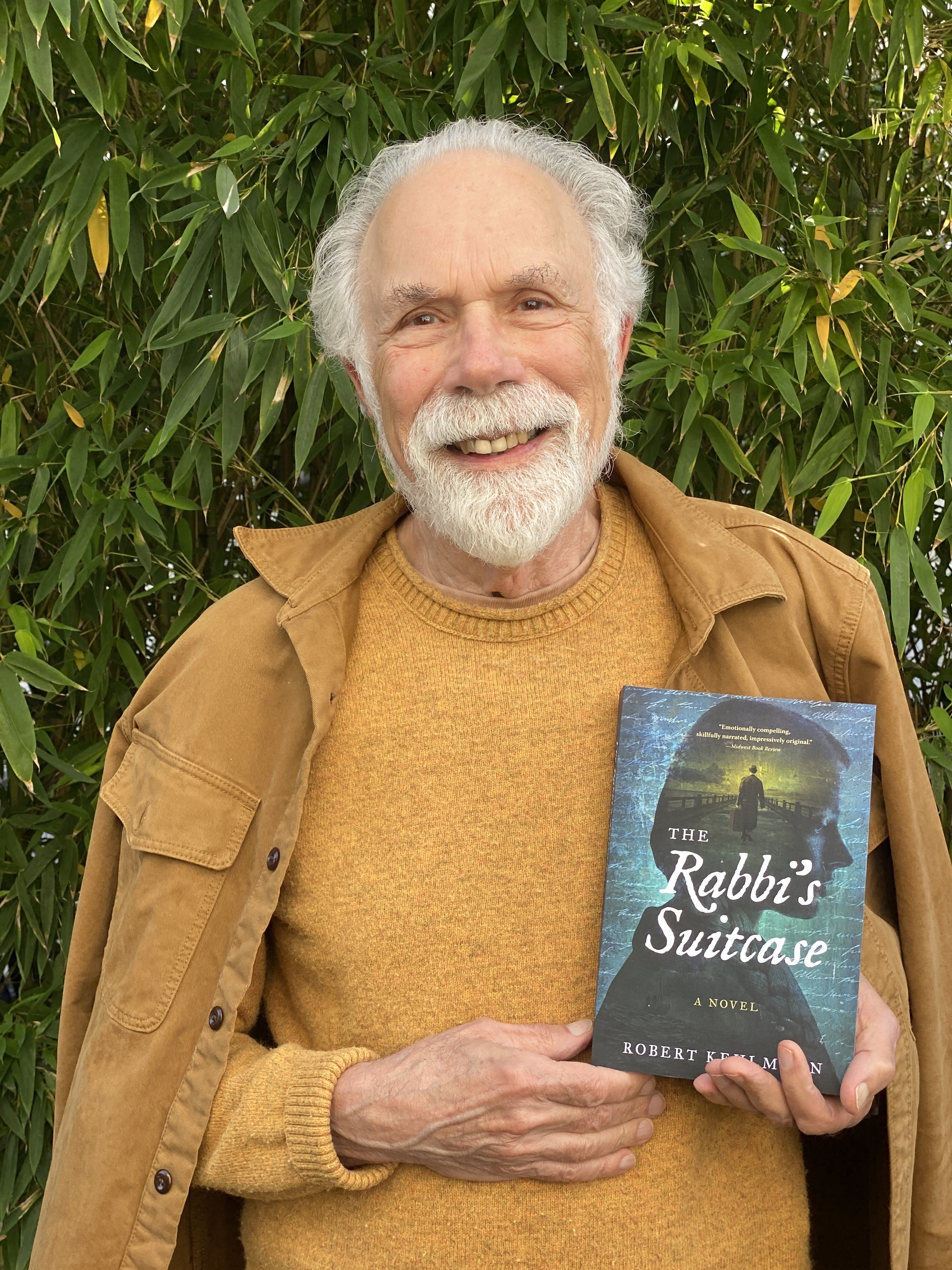
Robert Kehlmann with his book The Rabbi's Suitcase.

In later life, Kehlmann shifted his focus and published debut novel, “The Rabbi’s Suitcase,” after finding a trove of love letters written to his mother in her youth by Reuven Barkat, a man who later in life, as an ally of David Ben-Gurion, was a key figure in the founding of the Israeli state. Published in 2025, the work of historical fiction vividly recreates his family's 50-year migration odyssey from Lithuania, to Mandatory Palestine, to Depression Era America, with a focus on his mother's youthful romance.

The book has won the 2026 American Legacy Book Award for Best New Fiction, the 2026 Next Generation Indi Book Award for Historical Fiction, the 2026 NYC Big Book Award in Judaism, and a Gold Medal Finalist in the 2025 Jane Austen Historical Romance Book of the Year.

== Gallery ==
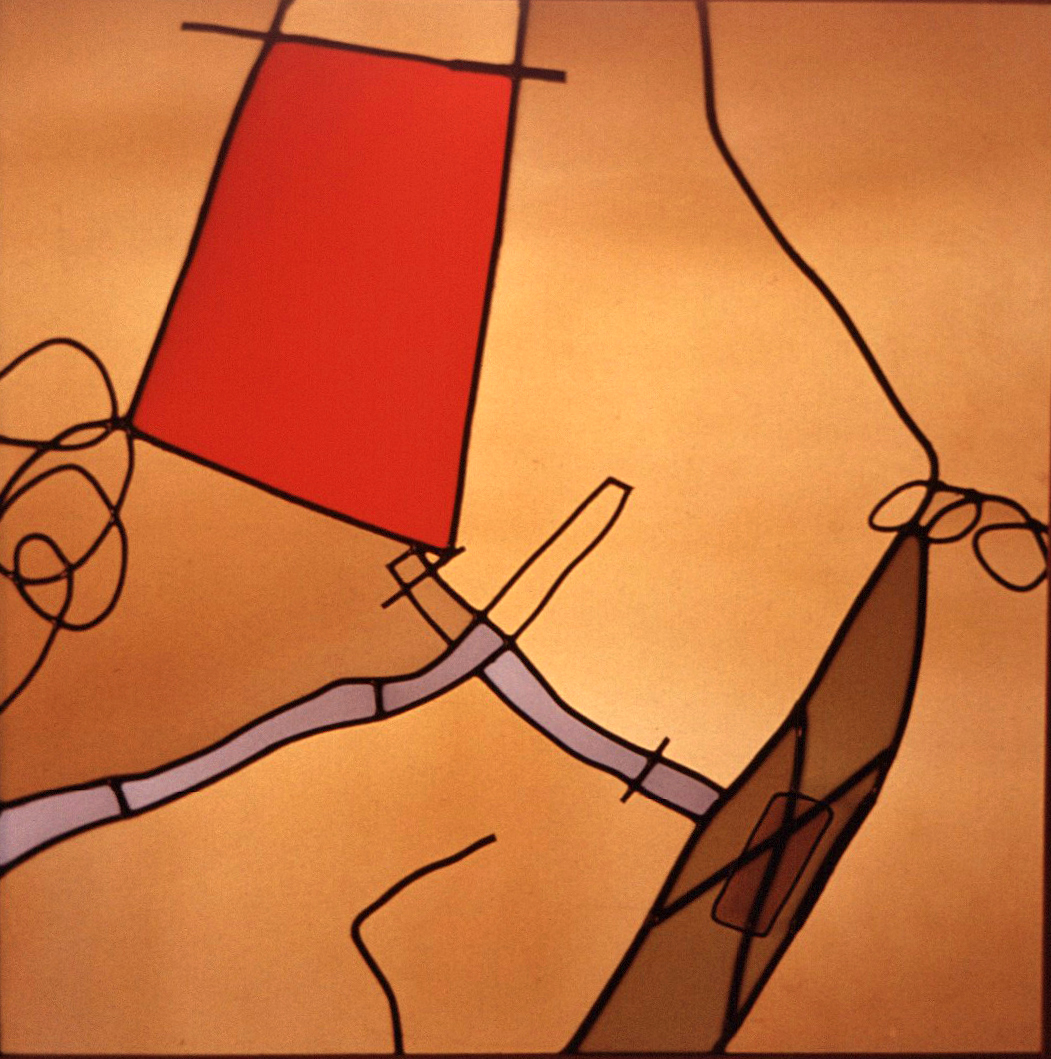
Robert Kehlmann, “Composition XXVIII” (1976), Museum für Zeitgenössische Glasmalerei, Langen, Germany.

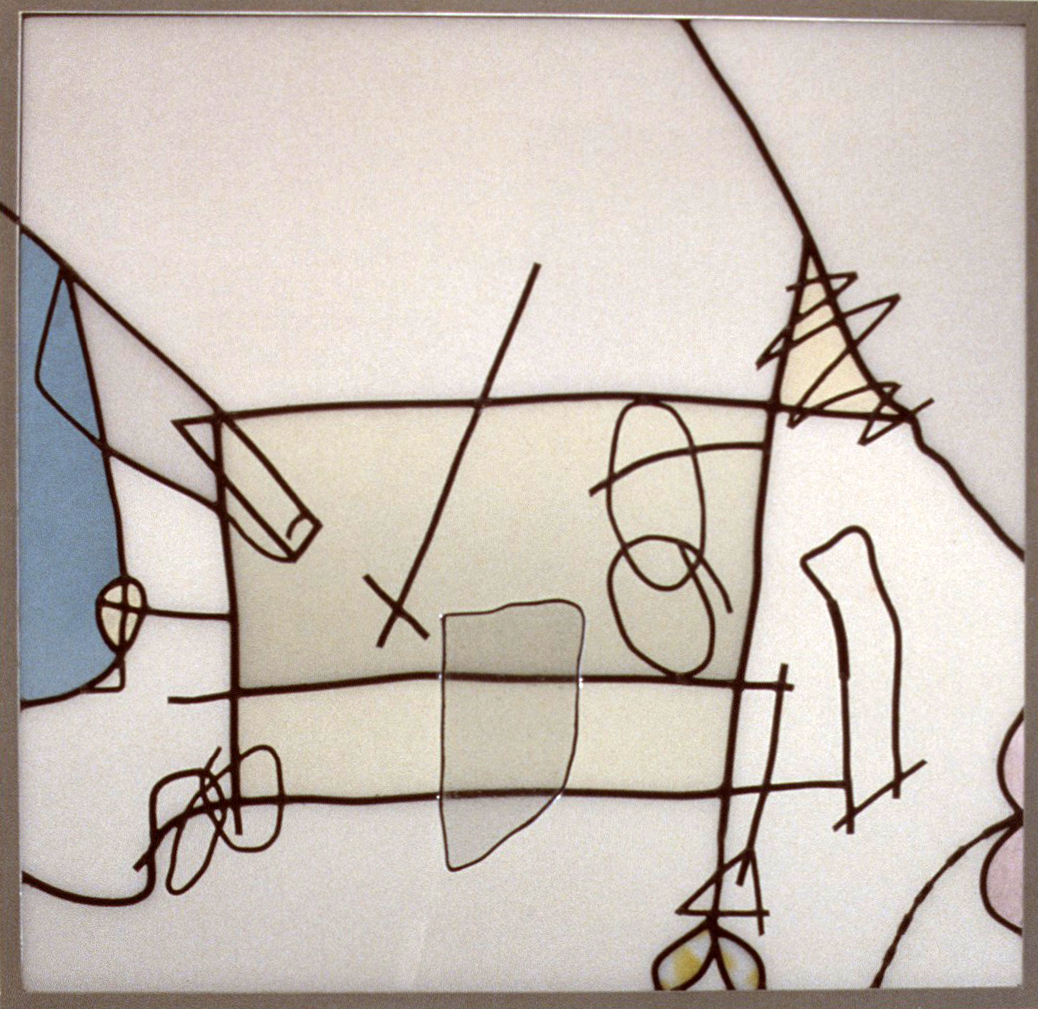
Robert Kehlmann, "Composition XXIX" (1976), Corning Museum of Glass.

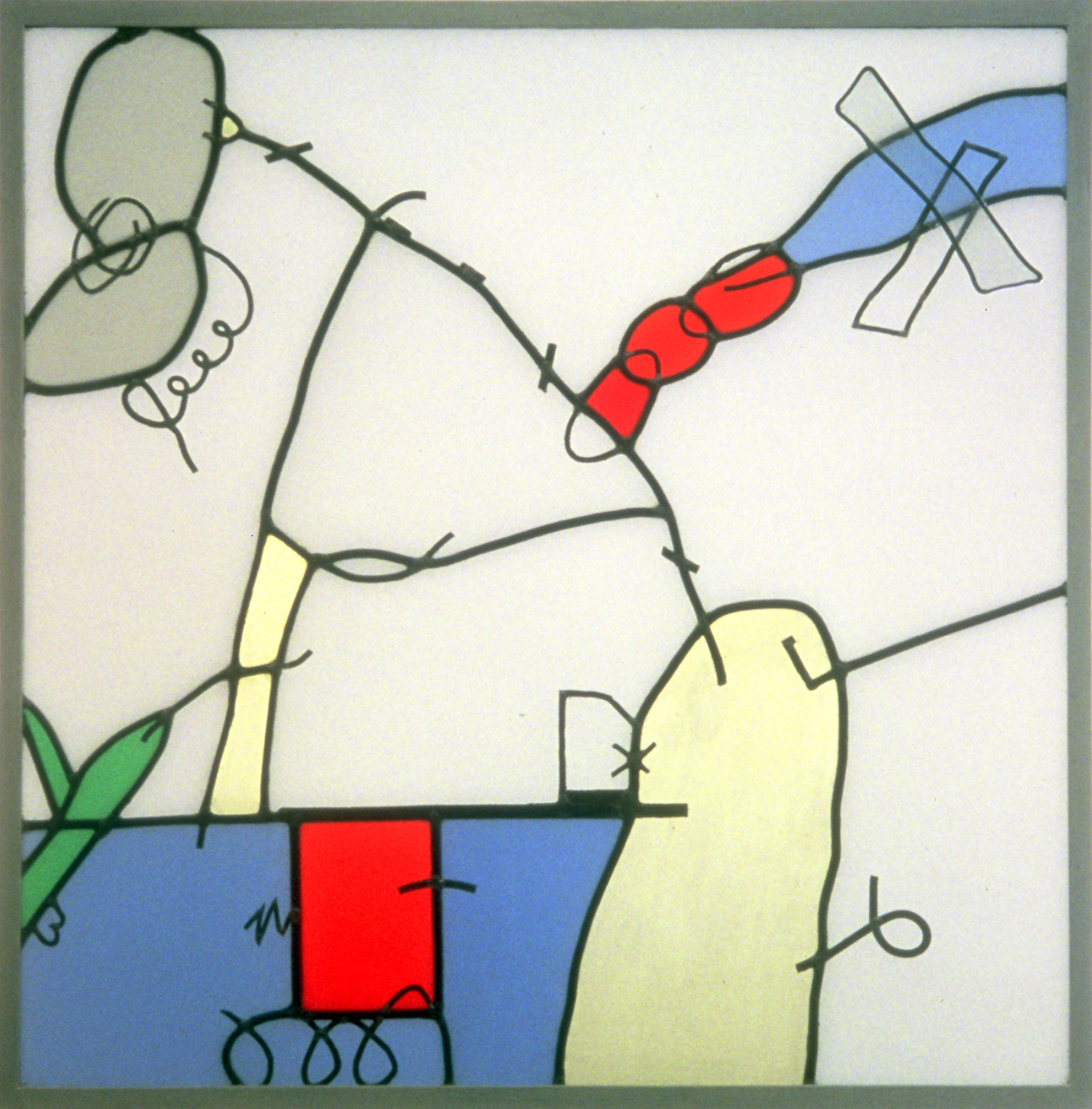
Robert Kehlmann, "Composition XXXI" (1976), Corning Museum of Glass.

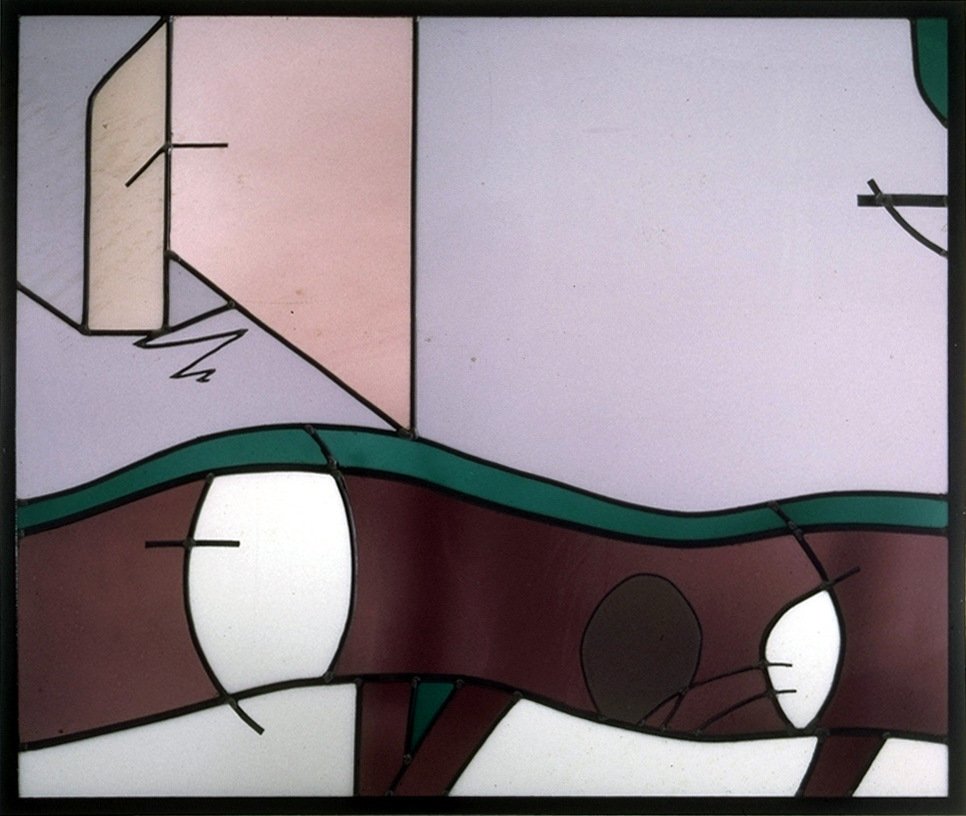
Robert Kehlmann, "Composition XXXVIII" (1977), Museum of Arts and Design, New York.

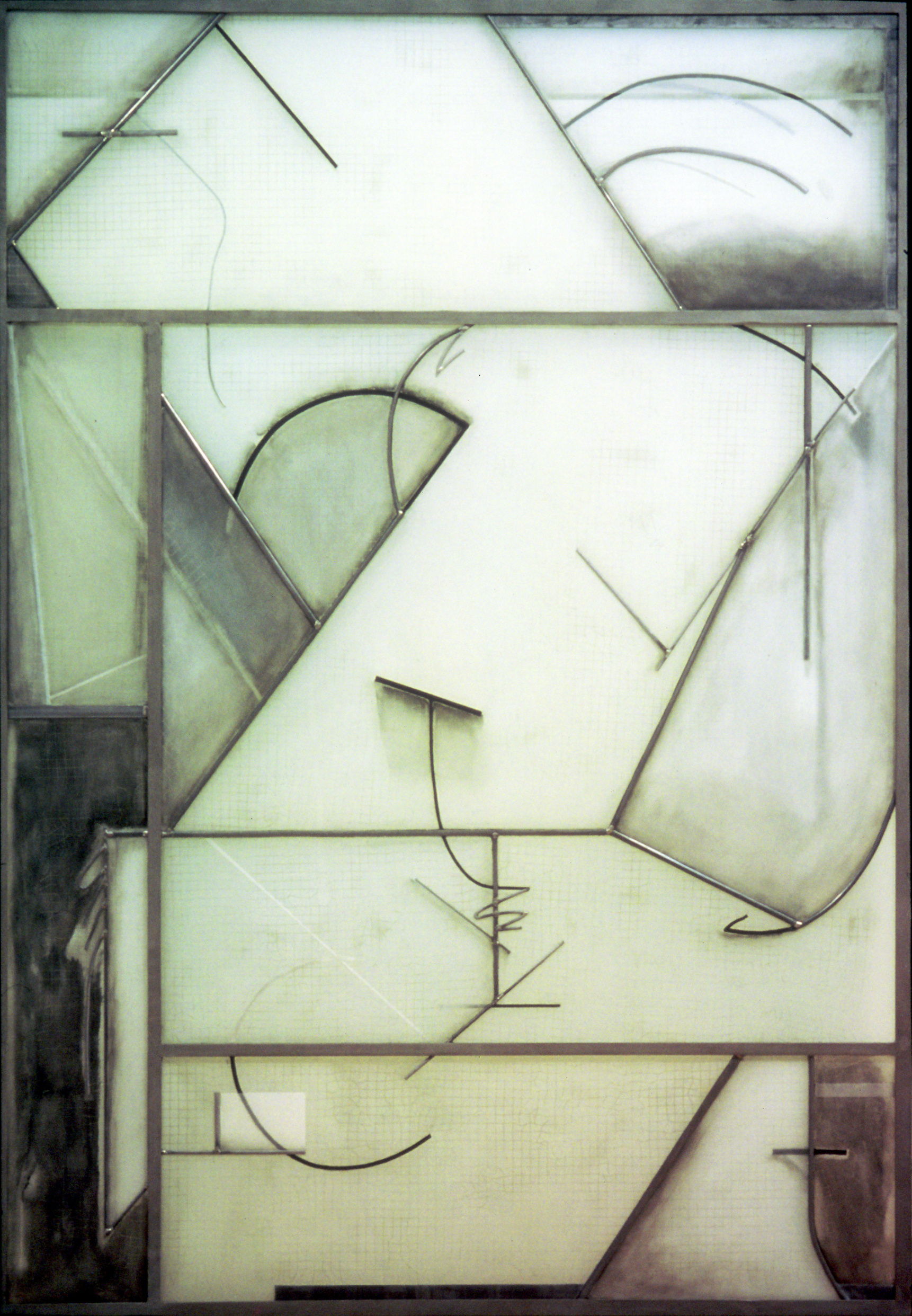
Robert Kehlmann, “Quartet” (1979) Private Collection, San Francisco.

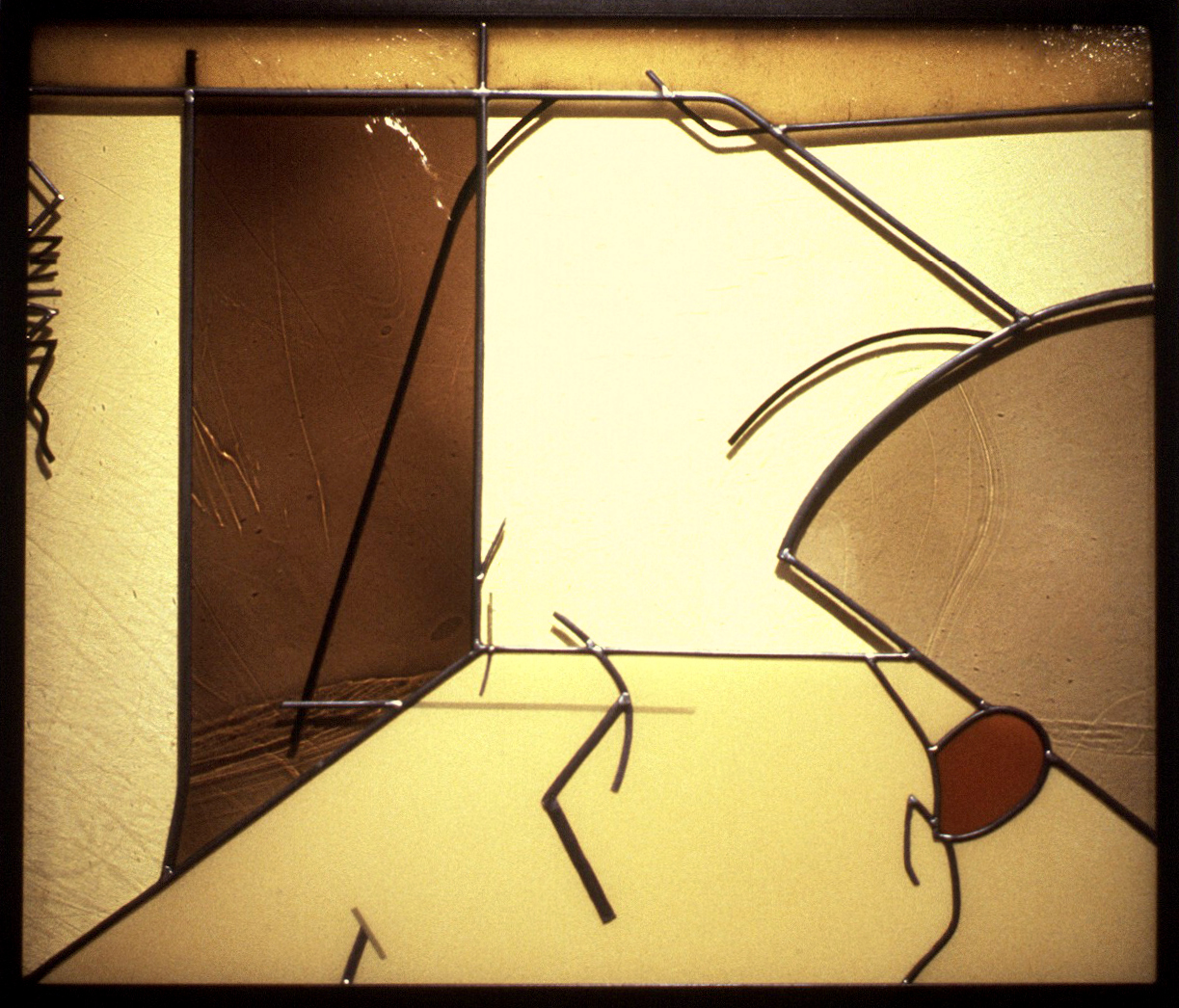
Robert Kehlmann, "Composition 55" (1979), Toledo Museum of Art.

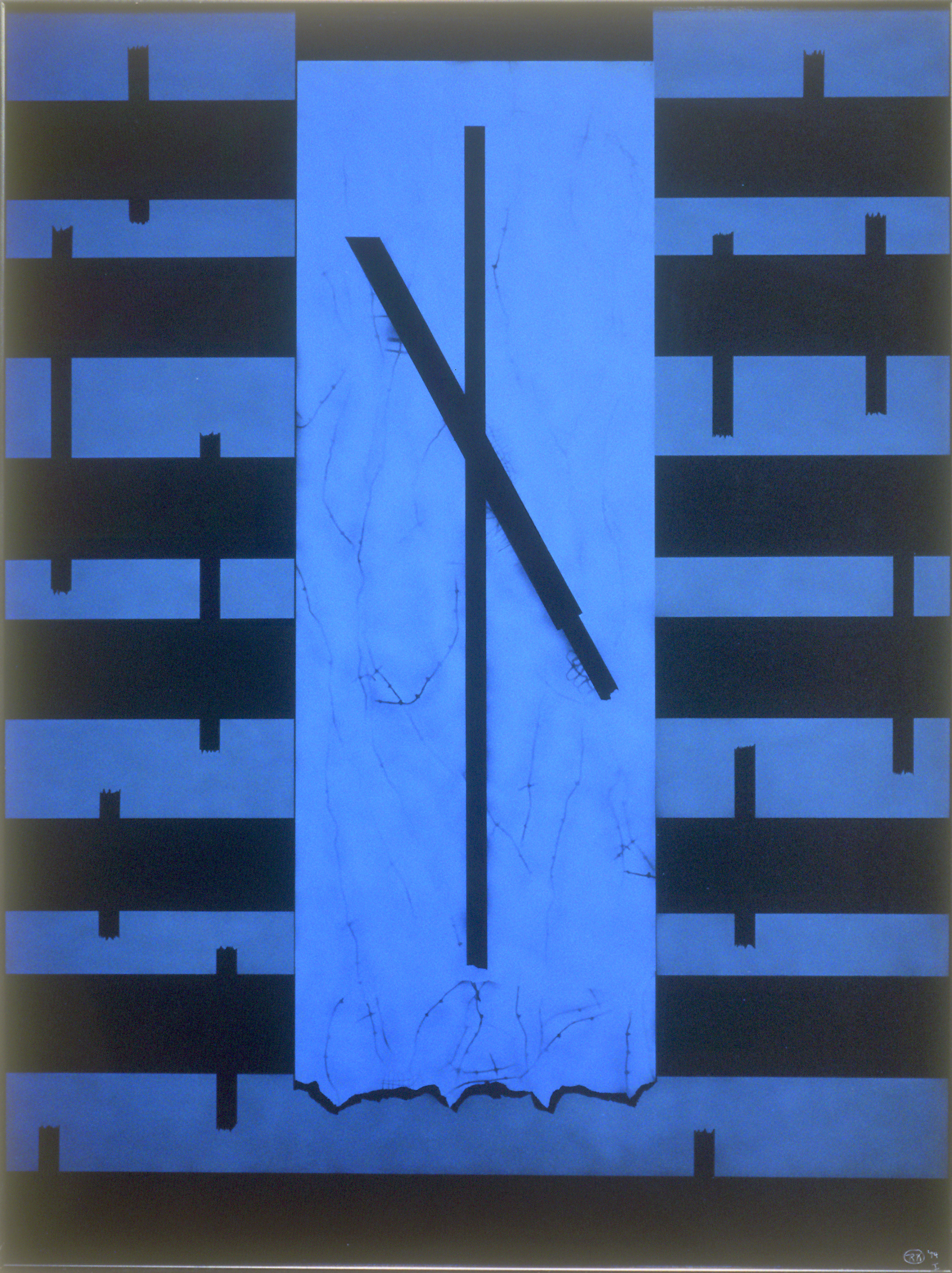
Robert Kehlmann, “Stations of the Cross I: Christ Condemned” (1995), Saint Mary's College of California, Moraga, CA.

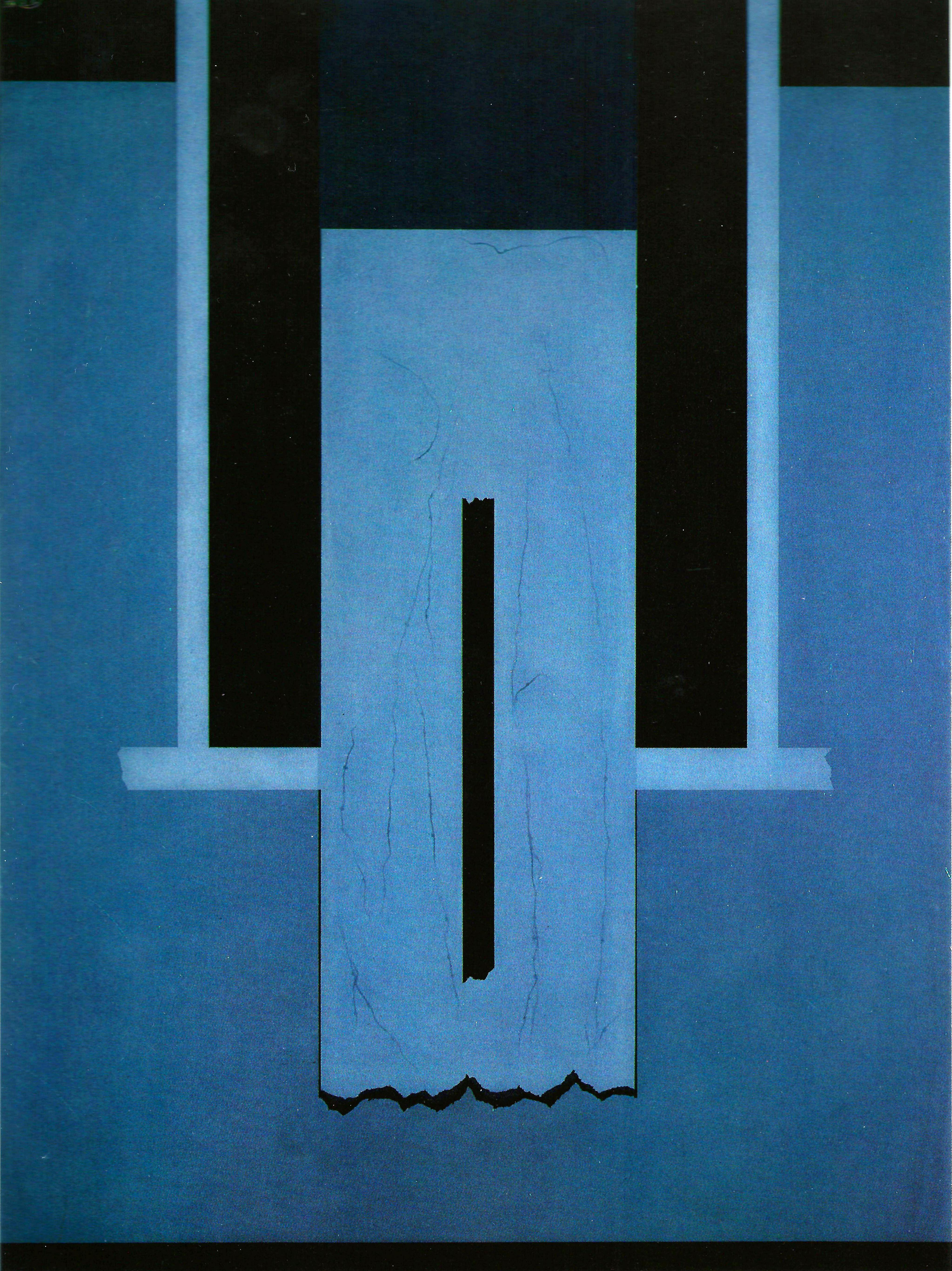
Robert Kehlmann, "Stations of the Cross XIV: Entombment" (1976), Corning Museum of Glass.

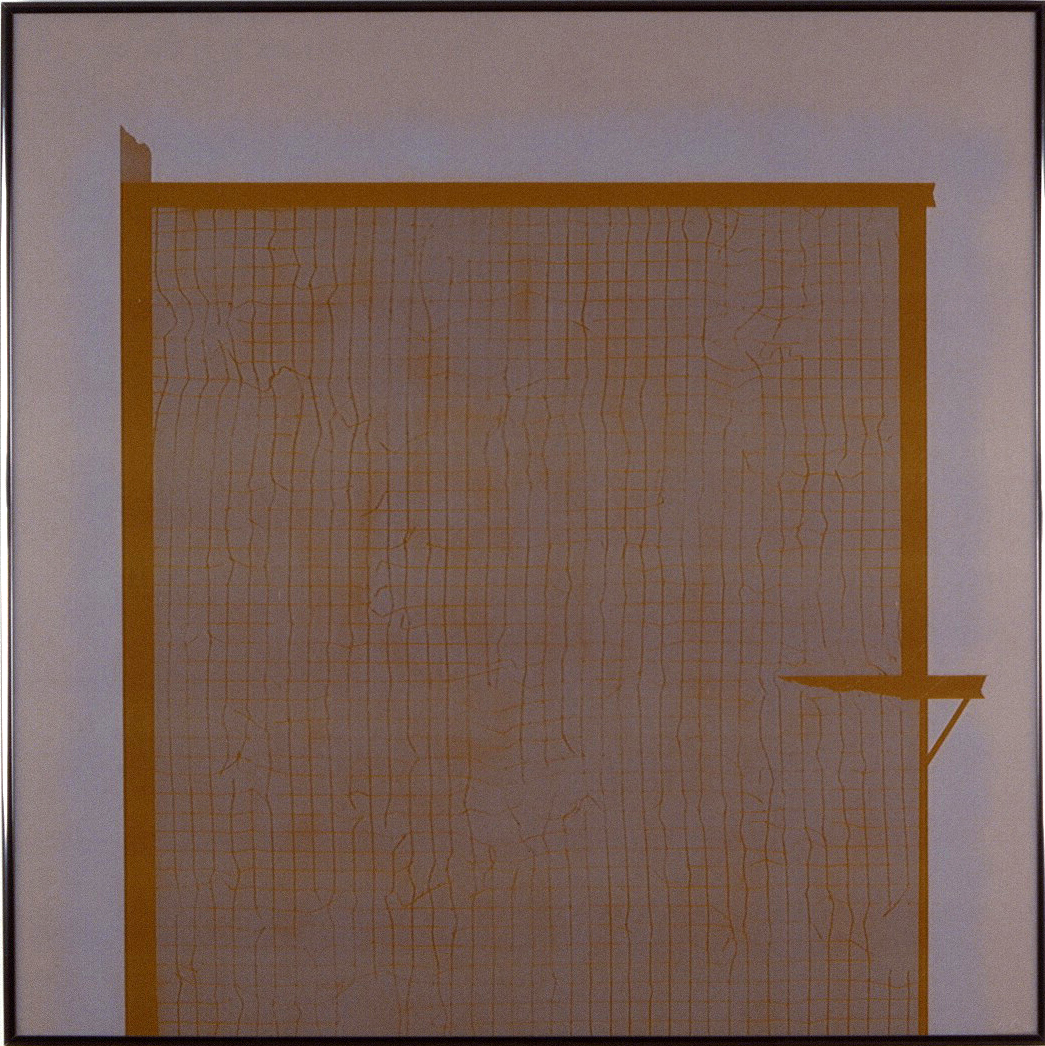
Robert Kehlmann, "Palais Royal V: Stage 1" (1982), Hokkaido Museum, Sapporo, Japan.

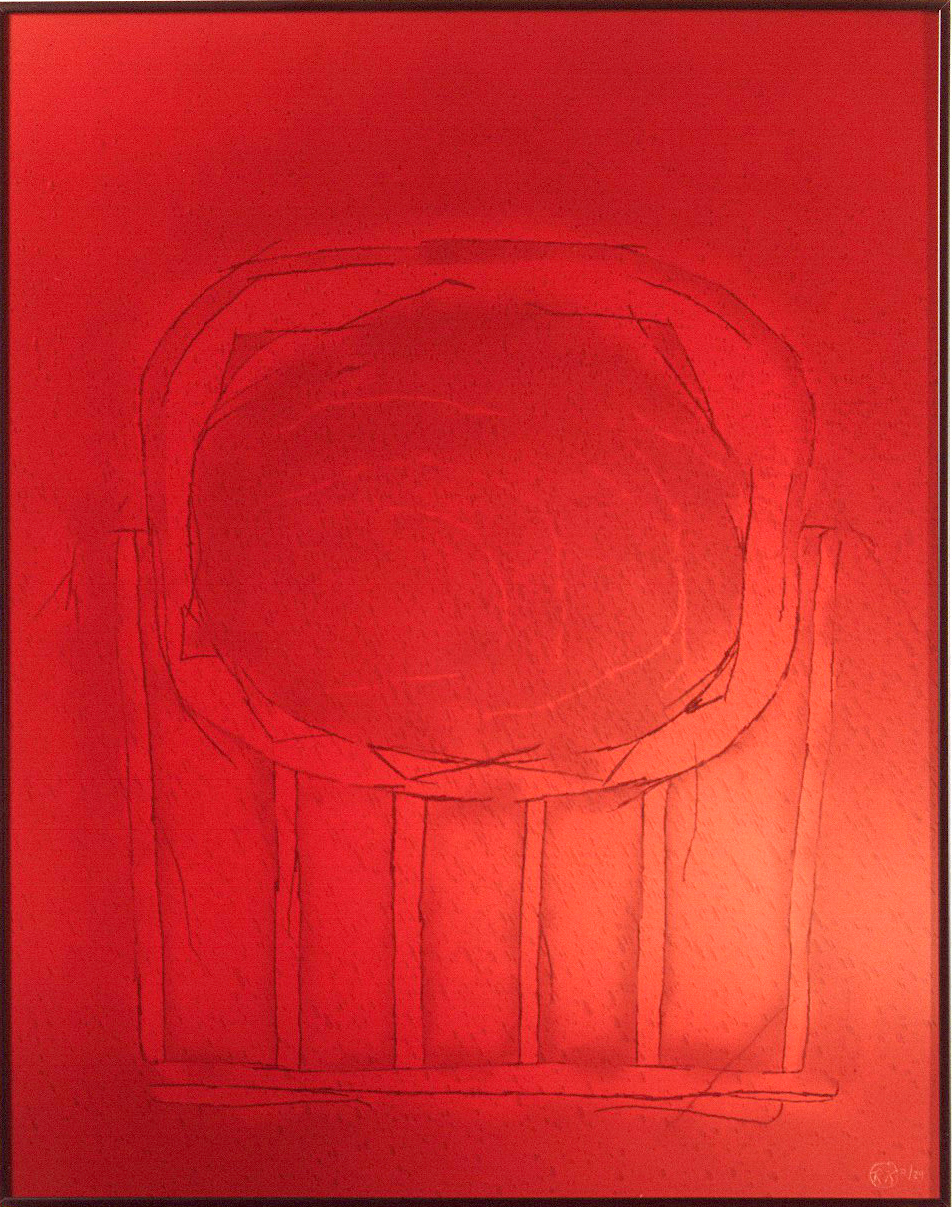
Robert Kehlmann, "Berkeley Venus" (1984), Musèe des Arts Decoratifs de la Ville de Lausanne, Switzerland.

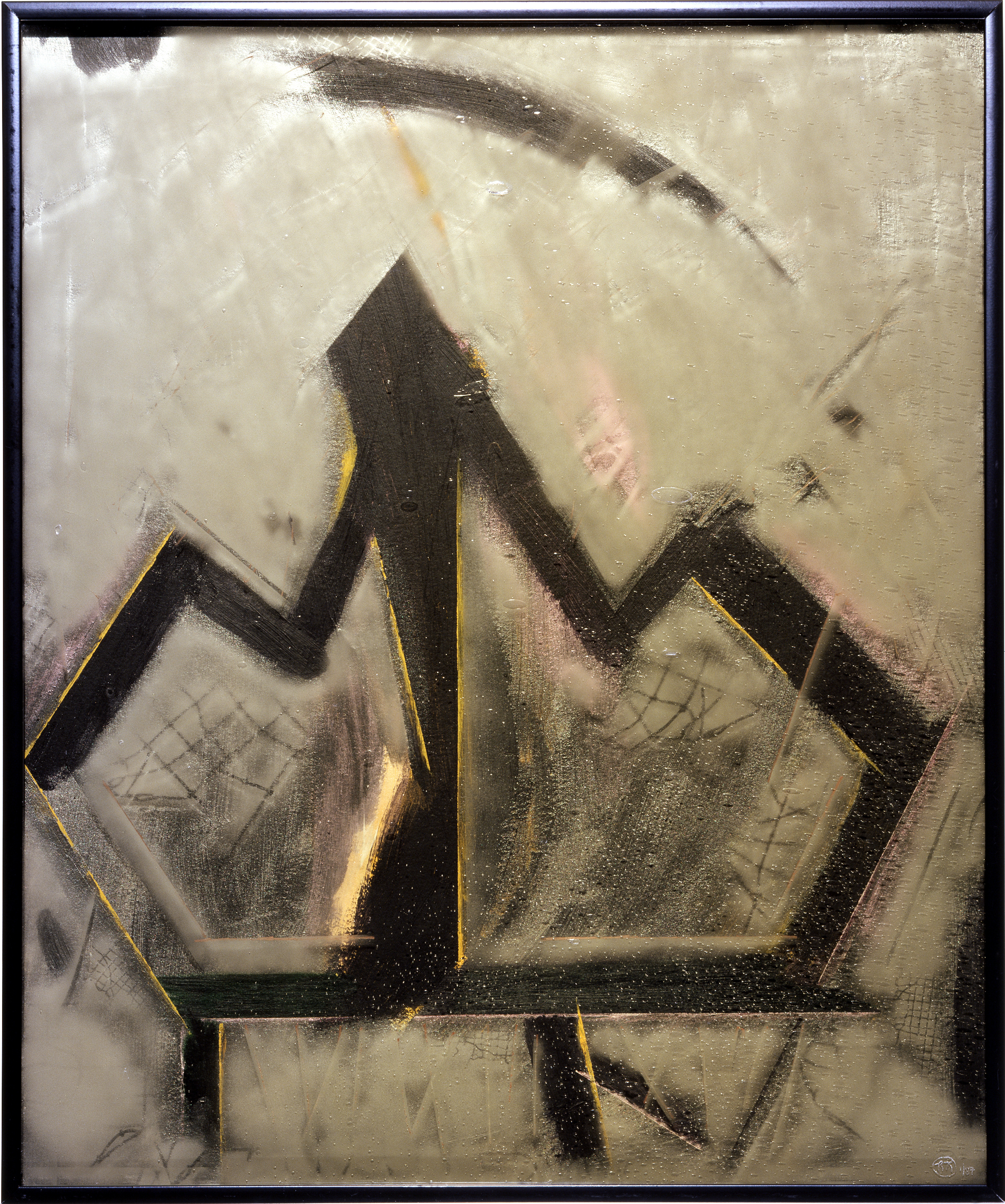
Robert Kehlmann, "Siren" (1987), Private Collection, Forest Hills, NY.

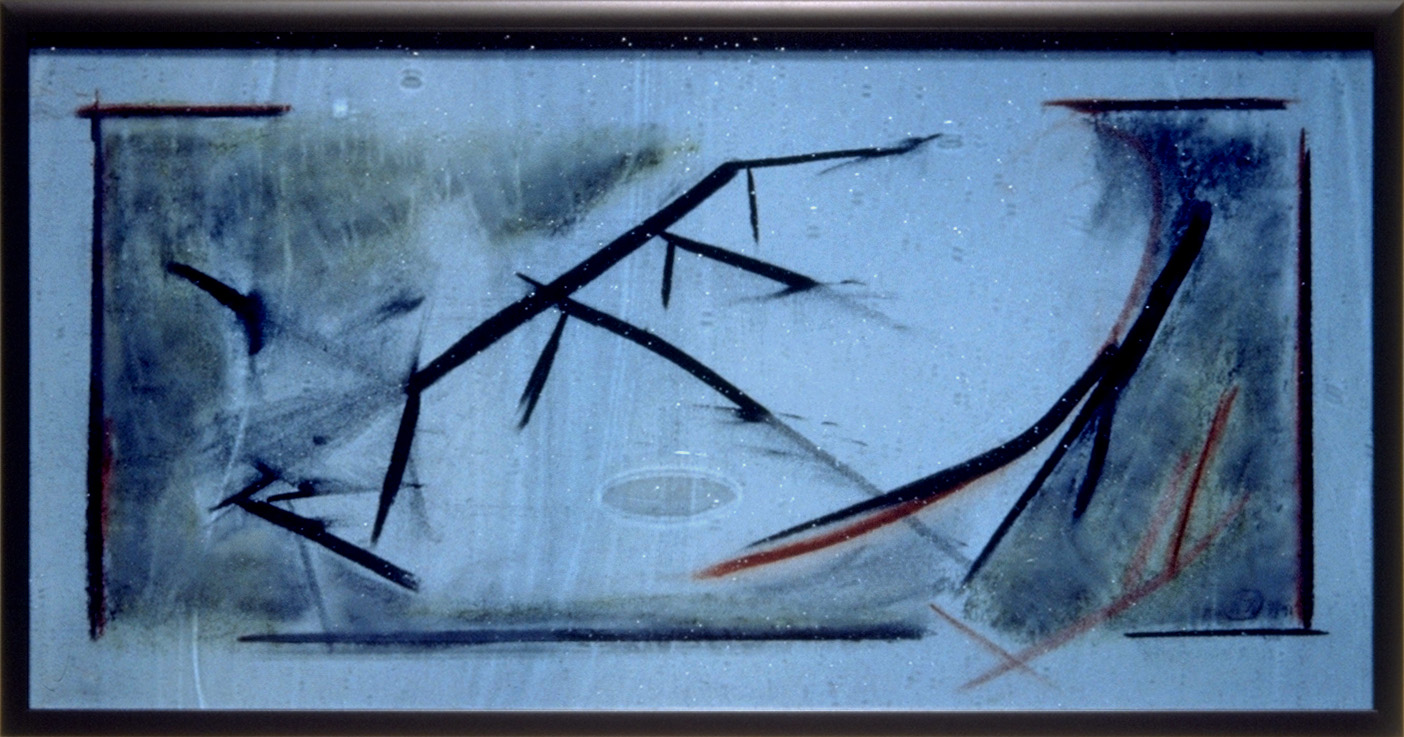
Robert Kehlmann, "Drake's Estero I" (1991), Museo del Vidria, Monterrey, Mexico.

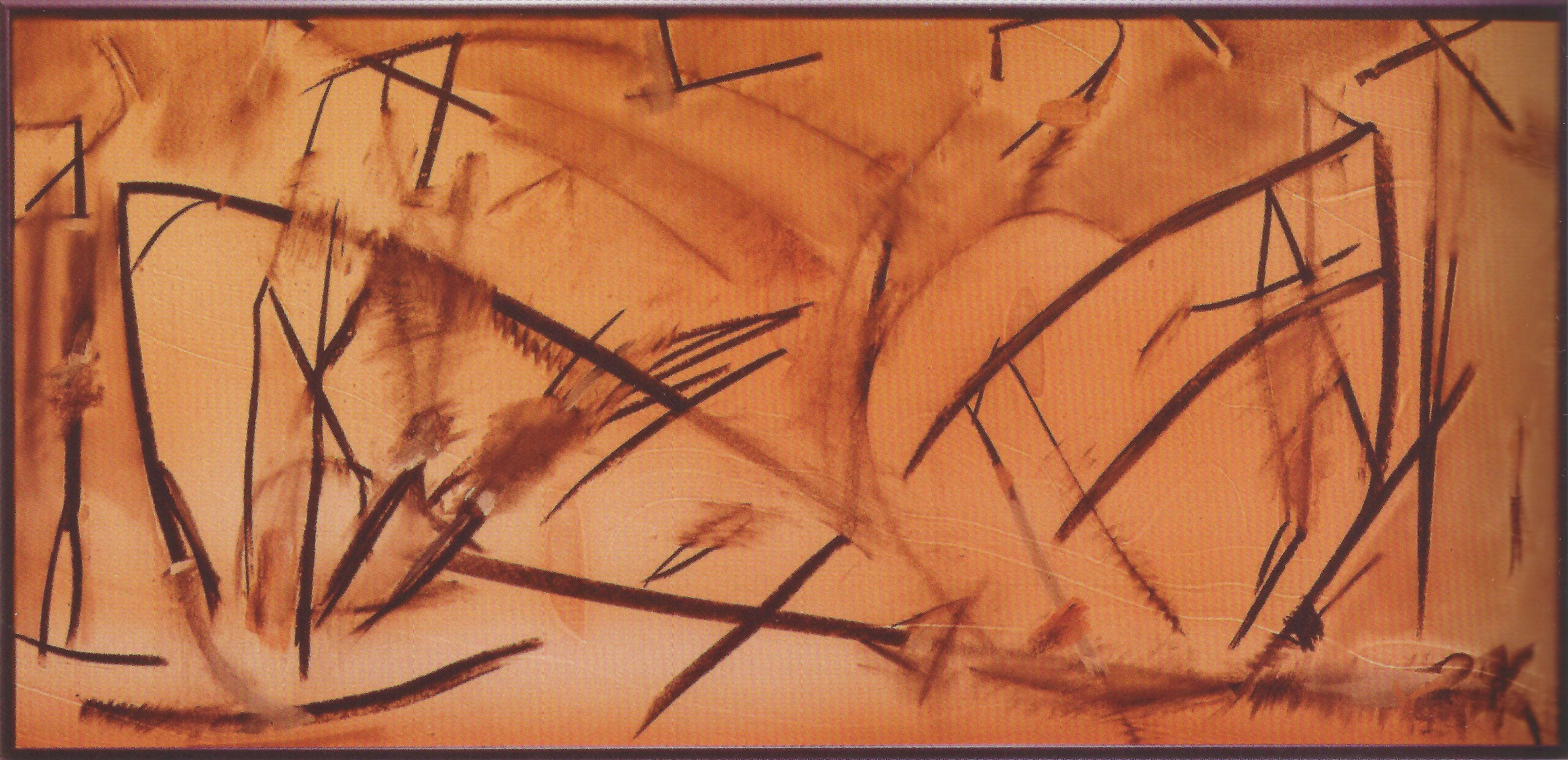
Robert Kehlmann, "Pythagoras' Lament" (1992), Kehlmann Studio Archive.

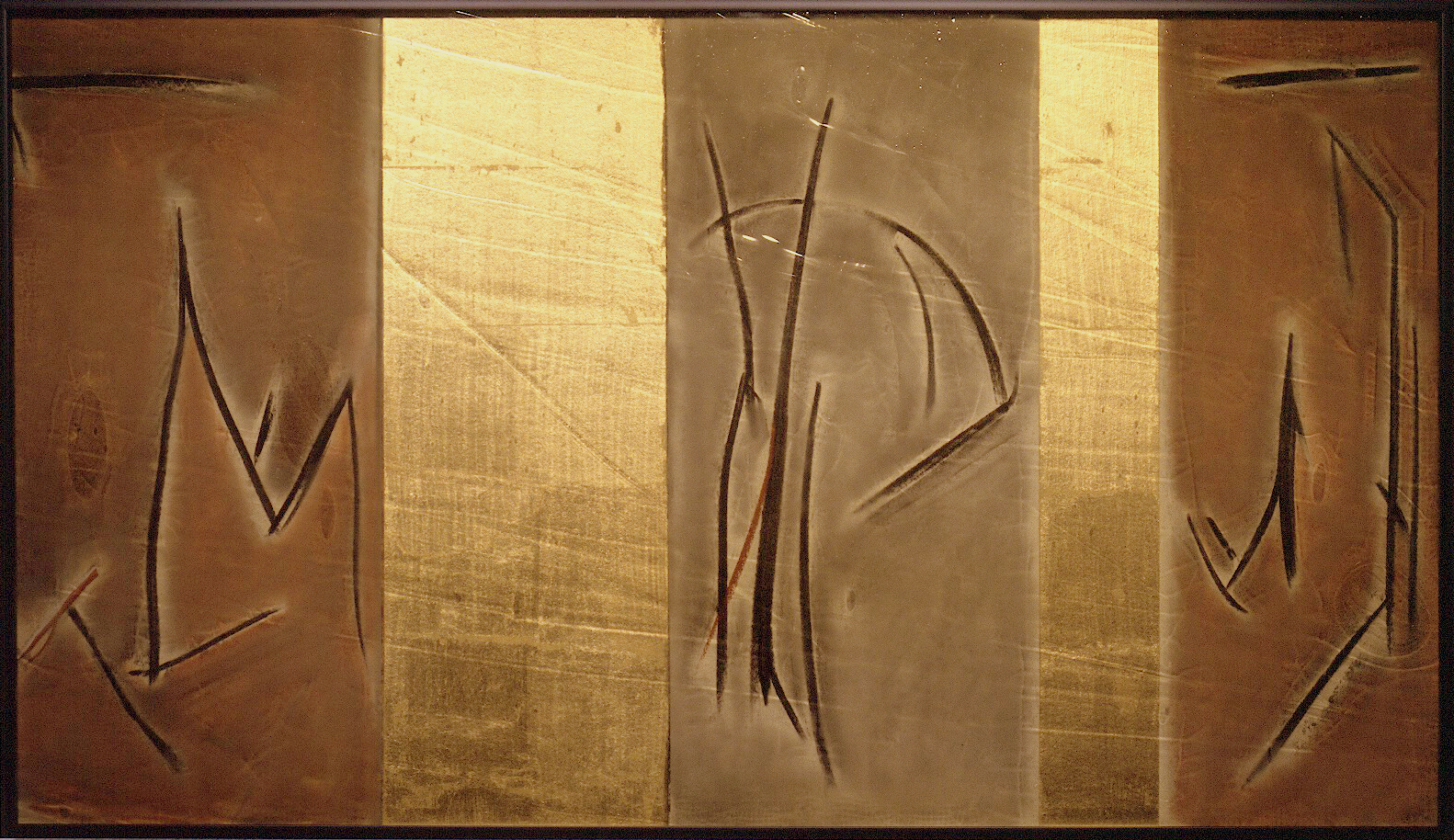
Robert Kehlmann, "Millennium Byōbu" preliminary design (1992), Kehlmann Studio Archive.

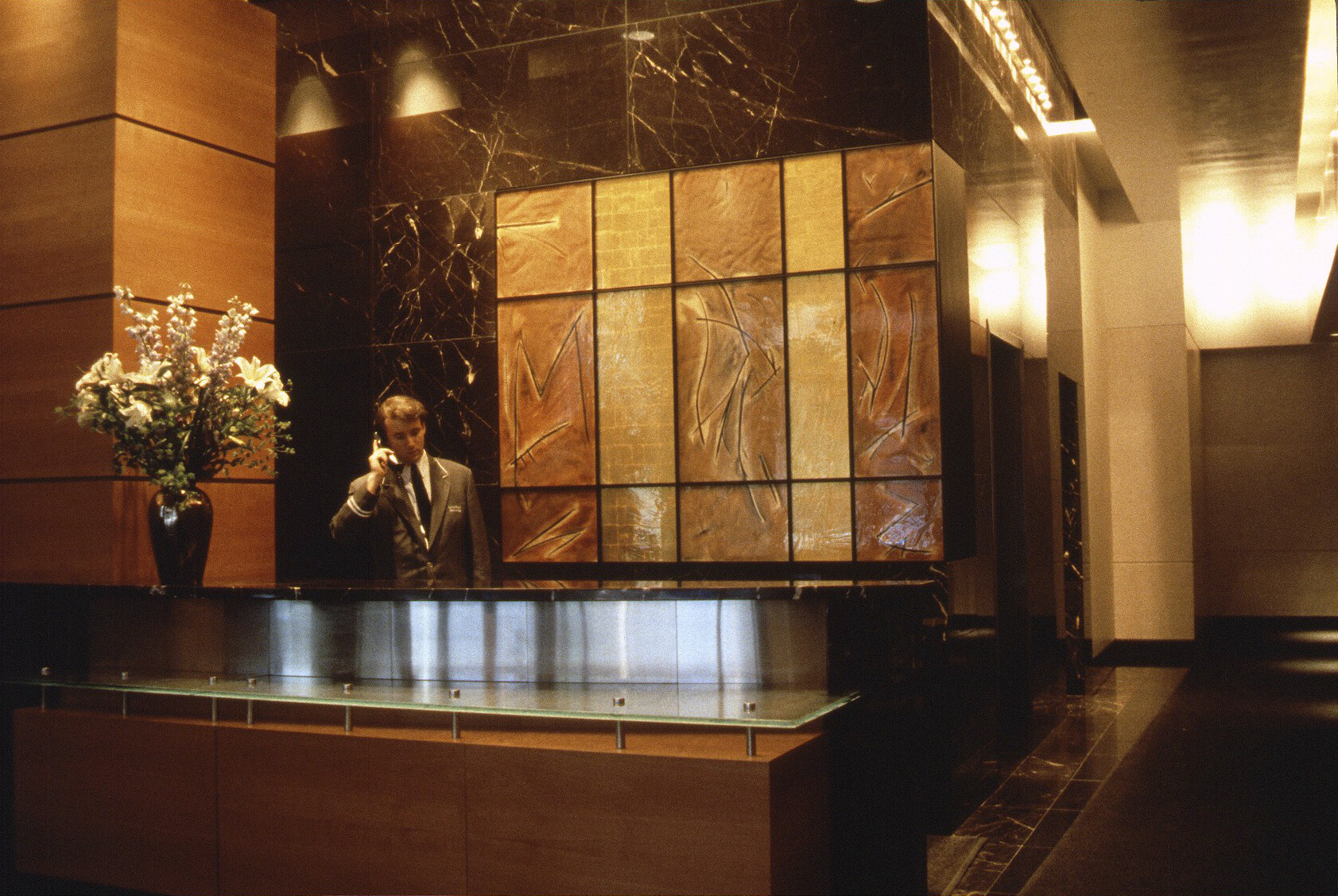
Robert Kehlmann, "Millennium Byōbu" (1994), Lincoln Square Residential Lobby, New York.

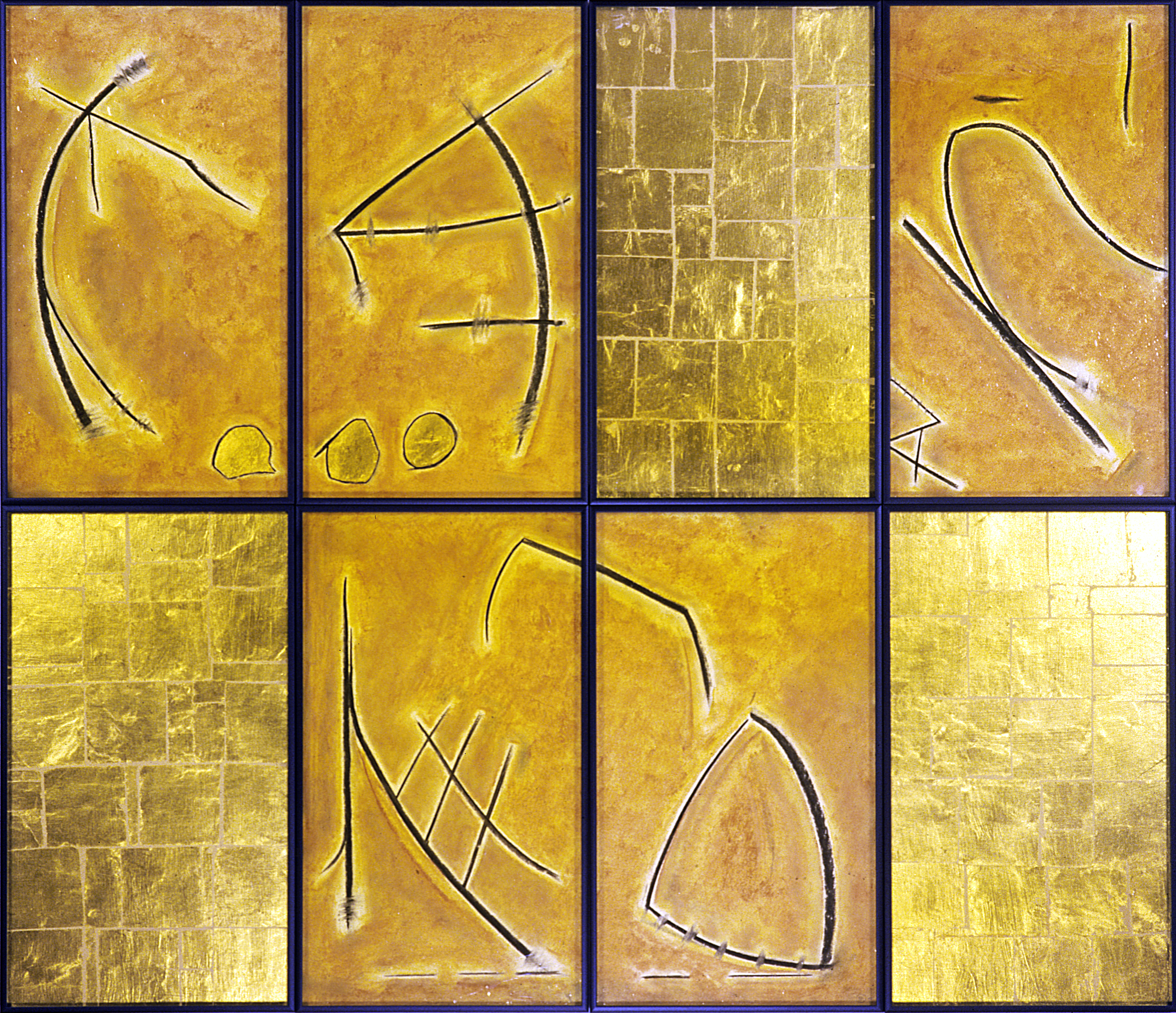
Robert Kehlmann, "Millennium Byōbu II” (2000), Four Seasons Hotel, San Francisco.

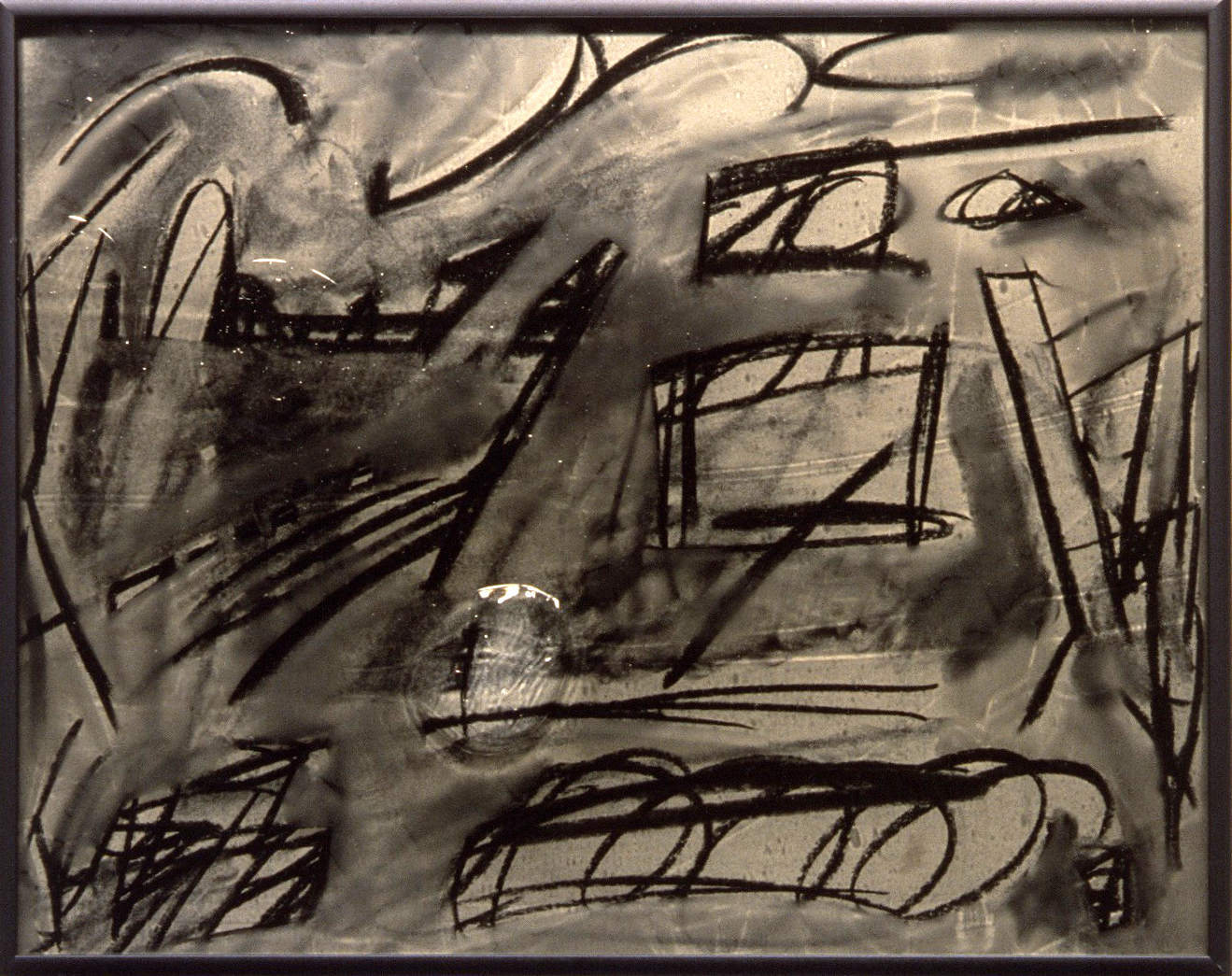
Robert Kehlmann, "Fort Wayne" (1992), Oakland Museum of California.

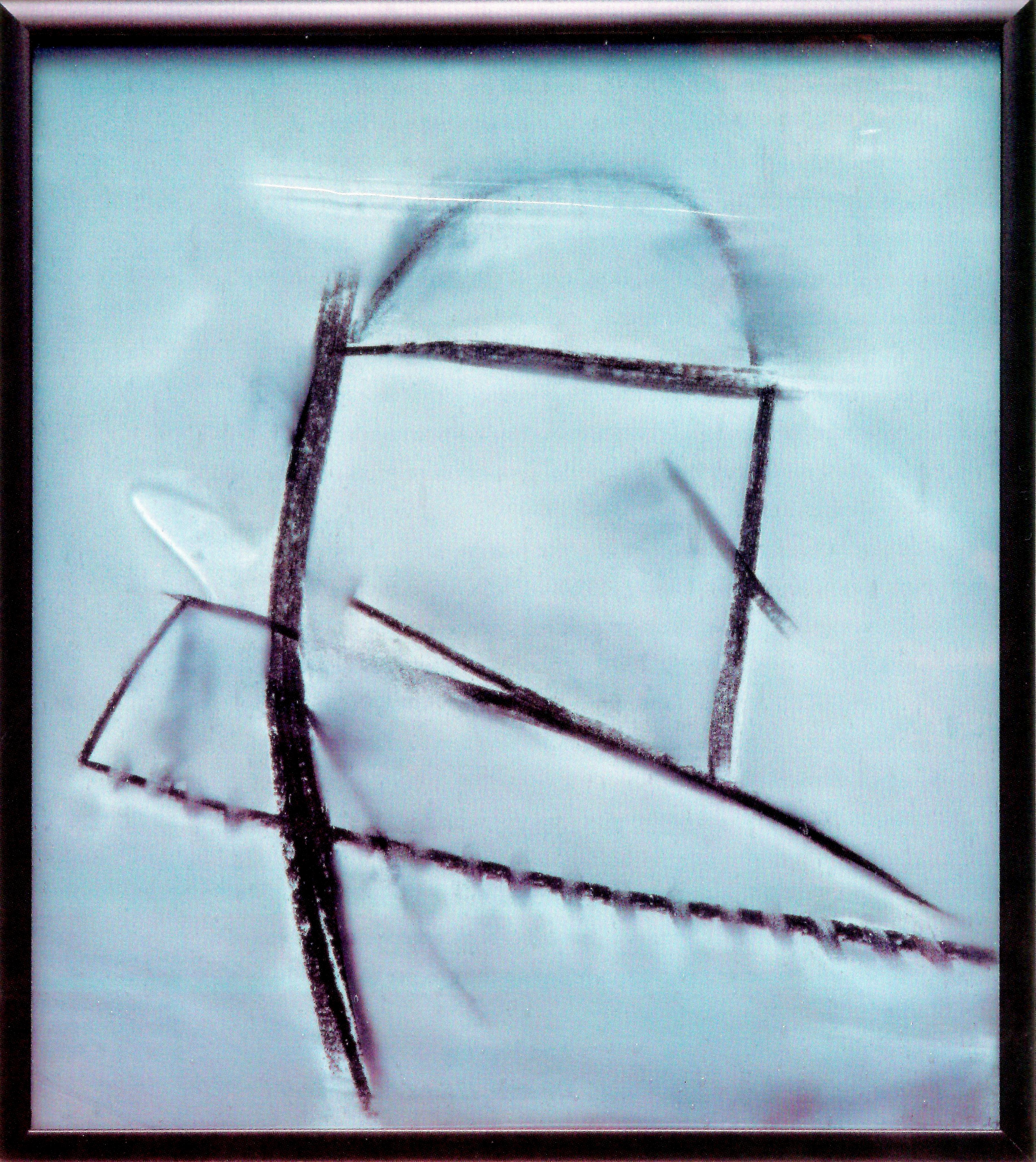
Robert Kehlmann, "Palimpsest III" (1992), Private Collection, Walnut Creek, CA.

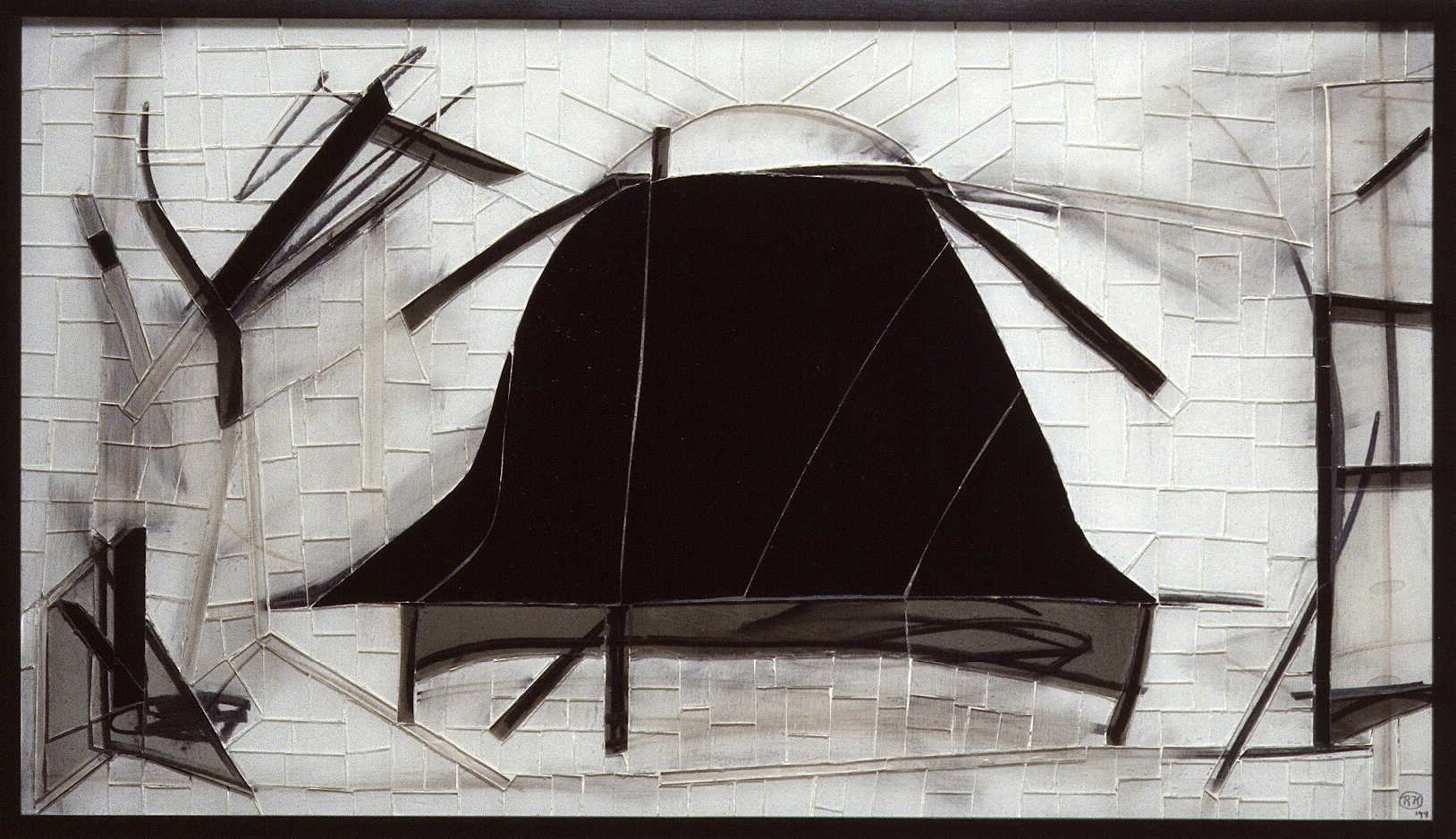
Robert Kehlmann, "Piano" (1994), Corning Museum of Glass.

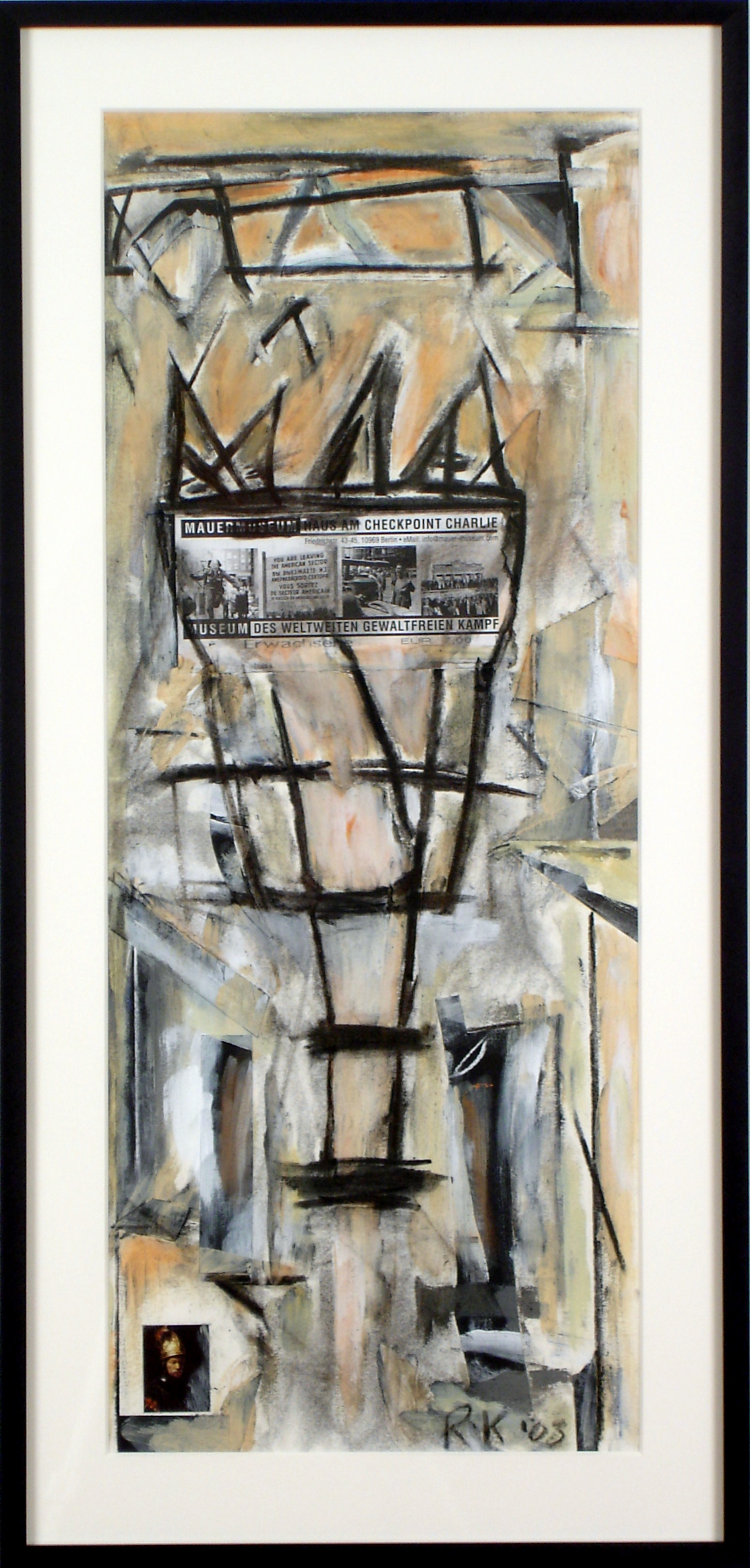
Robert Kehlmann, "Berlin Triptych: Checkpoint Charlie" (2003), Kehlmann Studio Archive.

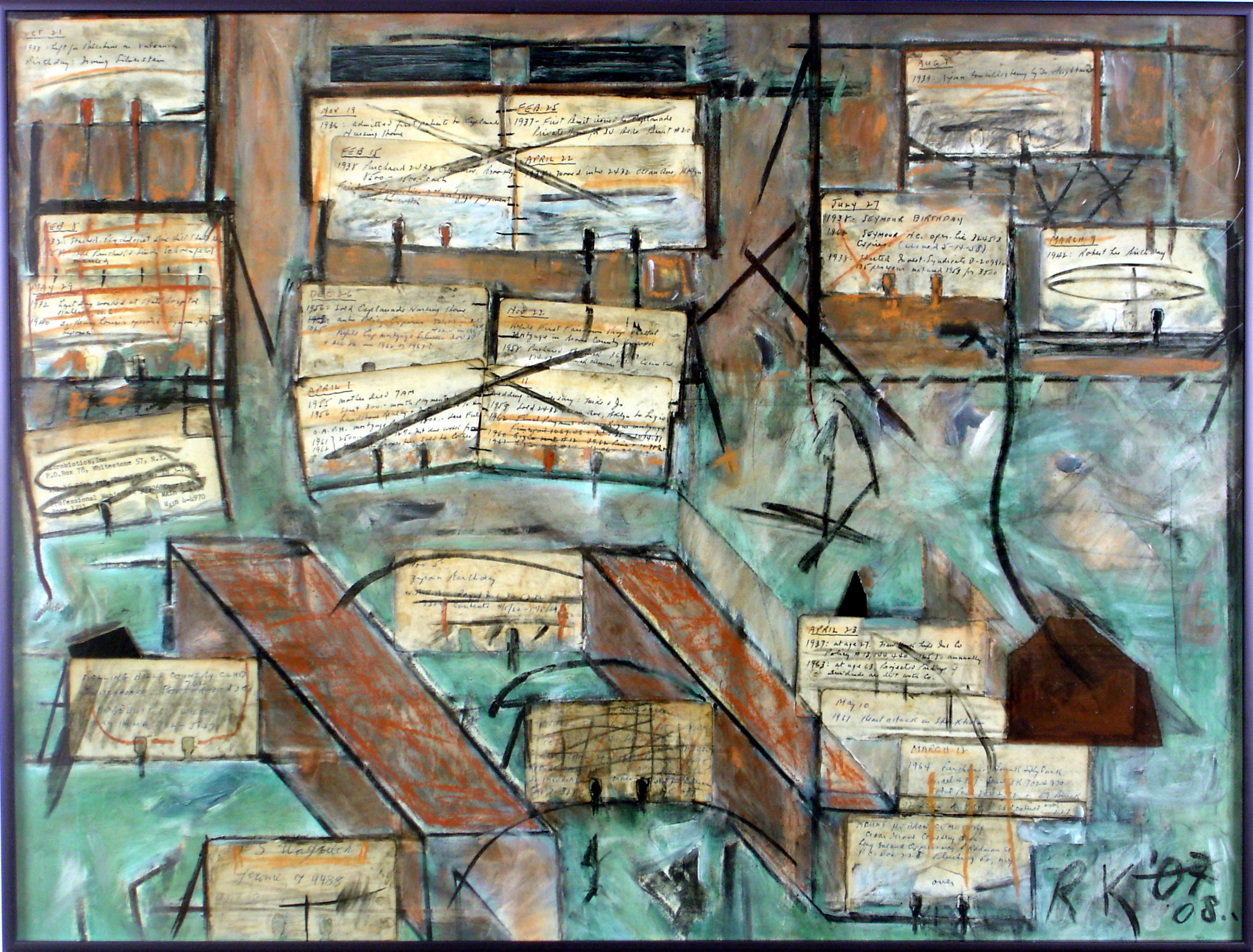
Robert Kehlmann, "Family History" (2008), Kehlmann Studio Archive.
