= Robert Sowers =

20th-century American painter and scholar

Robert W. Sowers
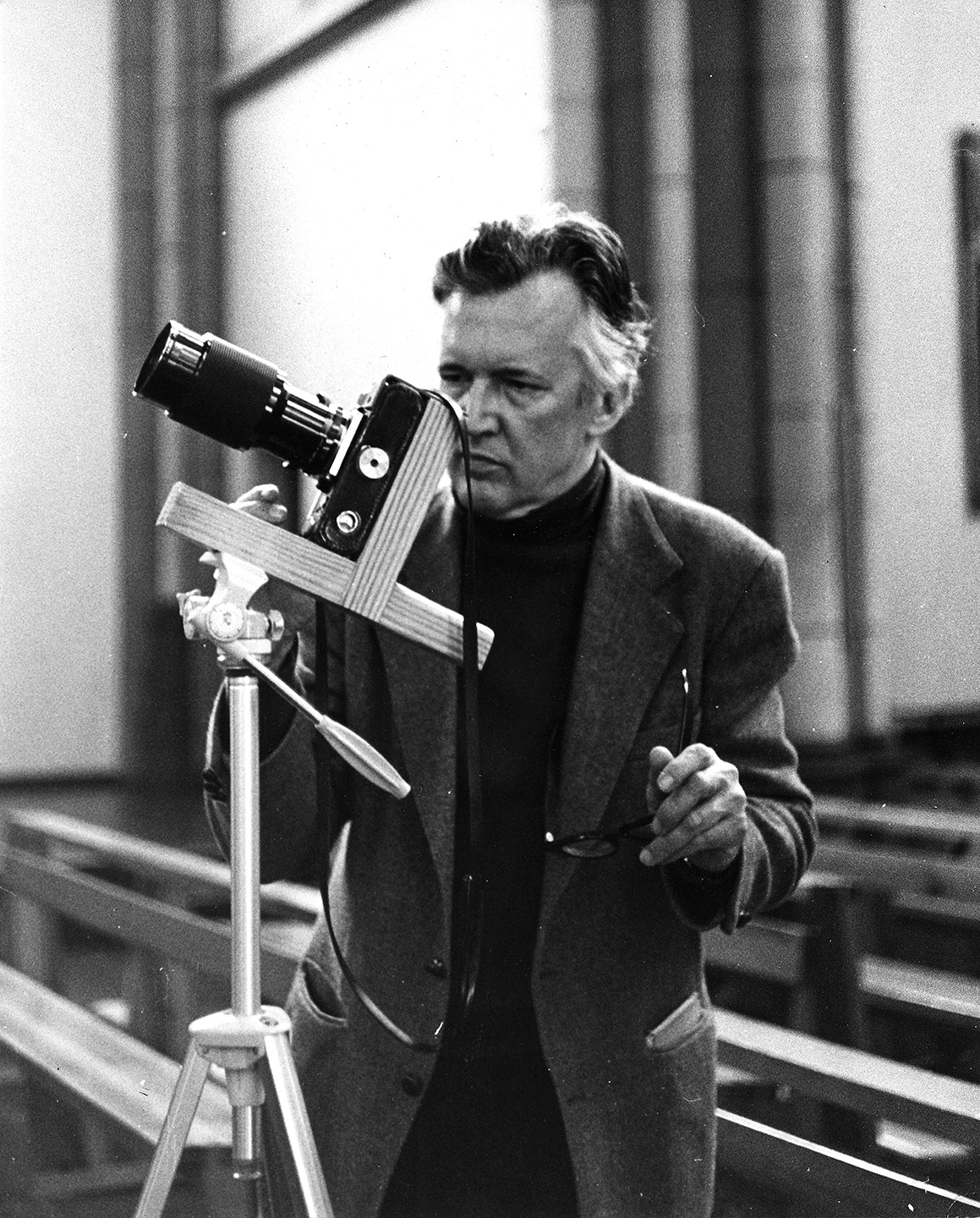
- Sowers photographing stained glass windows in Germany
- Born: January 7, 1923; Milwaukee, Wisconsin
- Died: March1990; New York City
- Education: New School for Social Research; Columbia University; Central School of Arts and Crafts
- Occupations: Painter, photographer, and stained glass artist
- Honours: Fulbright

Robert Sowers (1923 – March 1990) was an American painter, photographer, stained glass artist, and seminal figure in the re-emergence of stained glass as an architectural art in the United States. His architectural glass commissions cover some 20 years from St George's Episcopal Church, Durham, New Hampshire (1955) to Stephen Wise Free Synagogue, New York (1975) and the blue cross window for Cathedral of the Immaculate Conception (Burlington, Vermont) (1976 - decommissioned 2019). In November 1953 he participated in the New Talent Exhibition at the Museum of Modern Art in New York City. He designed the vast American Airlines terminal glass facade at John F. Kennedy International Airport in 1958–59. It was demolished in 2008 to allow for an reorganization and expansion of their terminal.

In addition to his glass commissions he wrote multiple magazine articles and published four books on stained glass, art, and architecture. He was an exceptional photographer documenting his own as well as other artist's glass work and spent many hours walking the streets and parks of Manhattan and Brooklyn with camera in hand. A posthumous volume of his B/W photographs was published in 1990. In 1979 he began a series of black and white paintings that eventually transitioned into color. These were based on his 35mm slides of derelict industrial landscapes, city parks, and botanical gardens of New York City and Tanglewood in the Berkshires. He sold his first painting through OK Harris Gallery, and reviewed the first printing of his fourth book almost simultaneously with his untimely death in March 1990. His archives are located at the Rakow Research Library, Corning Museum of Glass, Corning, New York.

== Biography ==
=== Early life ===
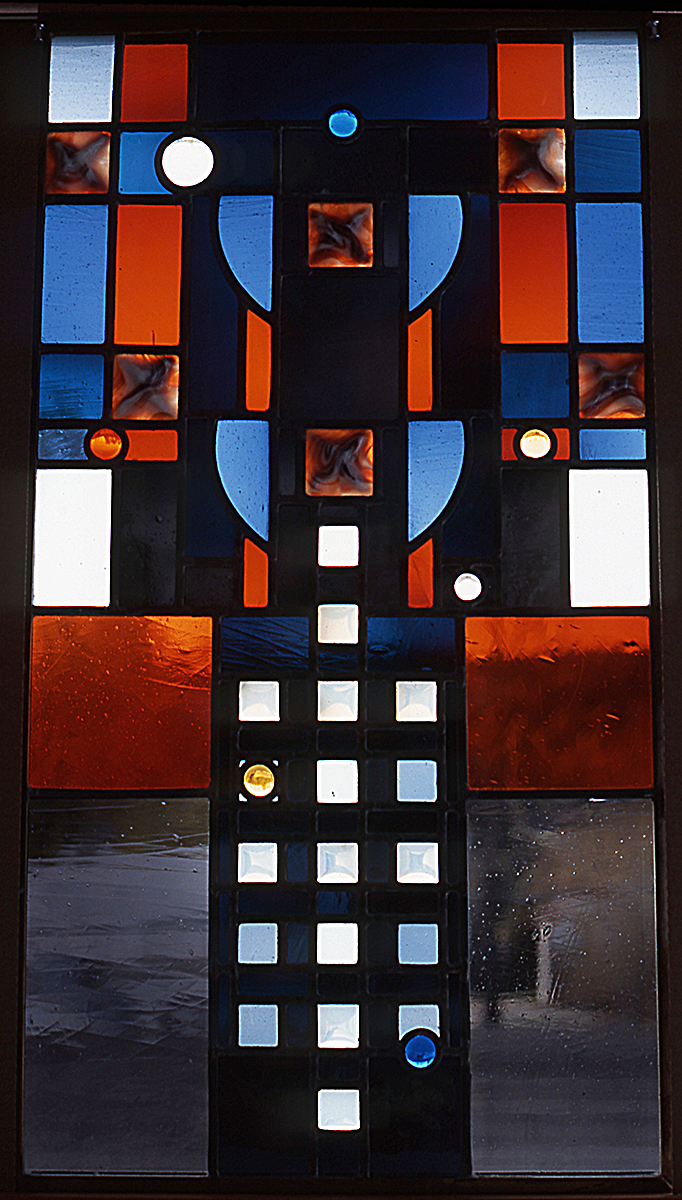
"Queen of the Blues", 1974

Robert Sowers was born in Milwaukee, Wisconsin in 1923. His family moved to Florida in 1932 because his father Ray Sowers, a respected educator, was offered a position in the state. His high school art teacher, Max Bernd-Cohen, encouraged his creativity, was a profound influence, and became a lifelong friend.

While serving in the Army at the end of World War II, Sowers was able to study art at Biarritz American University, Biarritz, France. On returning to the US he enrolled at the New School for Social Research, studied with the painter Stuart Davis, encountered the theories of Rudolf Arnheim, and graduated with a BA in 1948. In 1949 he received his MA from Columbia University. A Fulbright Award for the study of Medieval Stained Glass in the United Kingdom enabled him to attend the Central School of Arts & Crafts in London from 1950 to 1953. William Johnstone was the Principal and it was here that he completed special studies in stained glass with John Baker. Returning to Manhattan he and his wife, Terry Obermayr, at first lived in a large loft on the Lower East Side and subsequently moved to a corner brownstone on Congress Street, Cobble Hill, Brooklyn, NY.

=== Career ===
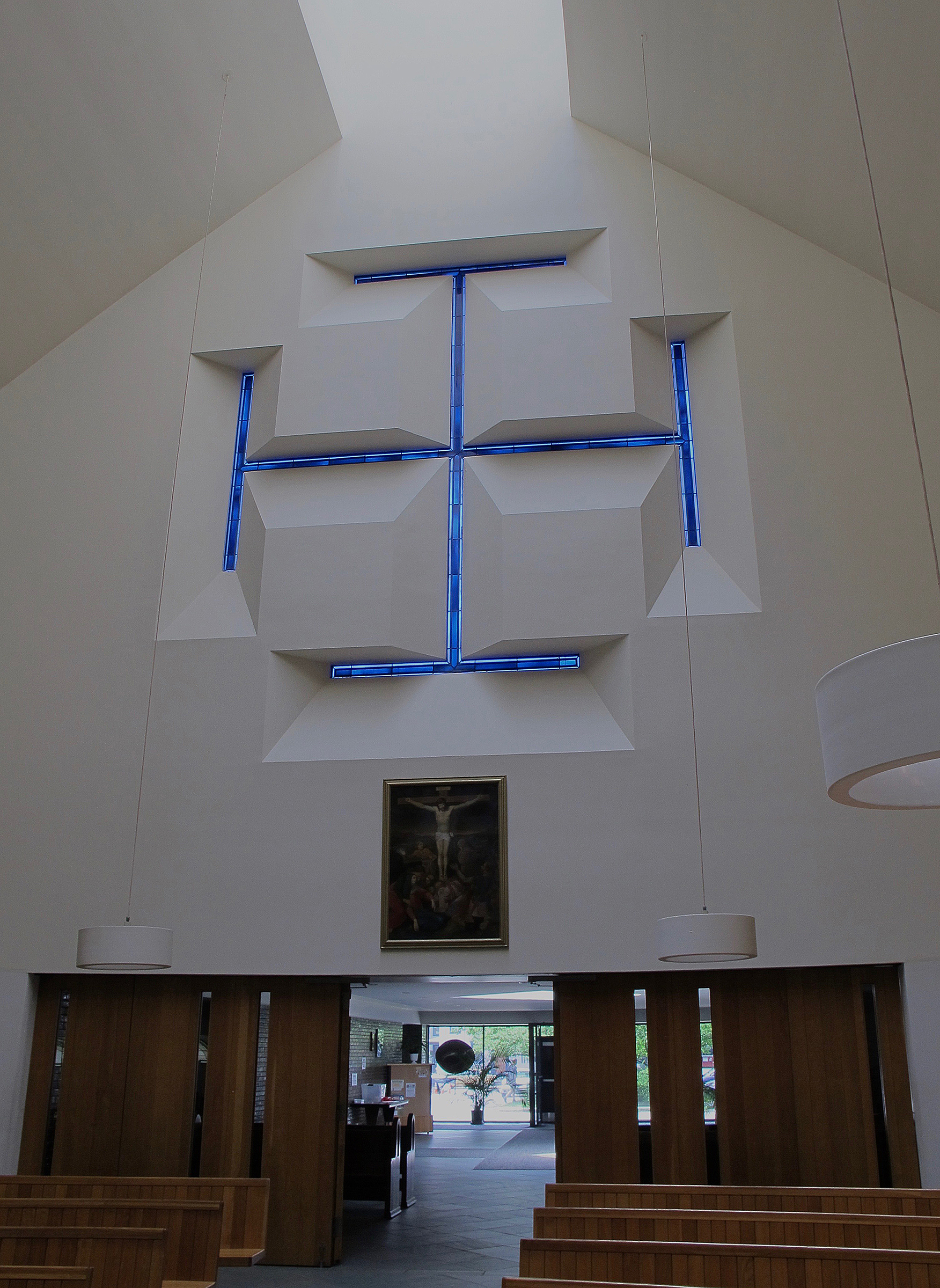
Great Cross window, Immaculate Conception Cathedral, Burlington, Vermont, 1976

Sowers began to pursue stained glass commissions though it was an uphill battle to get the attention of Modernist architects of that time. Architects whose buildings he did work on included Percival Goodman, Fritz Nathan, Eero Saarinen, Kahn & Jacobs, Edward Larrabee Barnes, Roger Ranuio, W. Brooke Fleck, Carter & Woodruff, Stanley Prowler, Henry Dreyfuss, Chloetheil Smith, William Garwood, and Philip Ives. In the execution of projects he utilized traditional painted and leaded glass as well as more experimental processes of lamination with epoxy resins and Dalle de verre. This period of commissioned work as an independent artist consisted of inevitable ups and downs and it was during one of these bleak periods that he decided to reconsider autonomous stained glass panels independent of an architectural setting. In 1971 he was Artist-in-Residence at Hopkins Center, Dartmouth College, New Hampshire. This marked the beginning of a period of small panel making including the incorporation of various cast glass shapes salvaged from the closing sale of Leo Popper's glass warehouse in lower Manhattan, and culminating in a series of panels exhibited at the Museum of Contemporary Crafts of the American Craft Council in 1975. For this panel series the design / cartoon was executed as a "painting" showing the details of the glass in full color. The panel and the cartoon make a pair. A number of these design/paintings are now located in the Rakow Research Library. In addition to the Fulbright Award, he also received the Silver Medal from the Architectural League in 1955 and 1962, a Tiffany Award in 1956, and a Certificate of Merit from the Municipal Art Society in 1961.

The destruction in post-war Germany created opportunities for stained glass installations in the reconstruction of religious and secular buildings and the emergence of such very different glass artists as Georg Meistermann, Maria Katsgrau, Ludwig Schaffrath, Johannes Schreiter, Wilhelm Buschulte, Jochem Poensgen, and Joachim Klos. Sowers developed personal relationships and enduring friendships with a number of them and, most importantly, brought awareness of their work to a younger generation of glass artists and designers around the world. In America these included David Wilson, Kenneth von Roenn, Peter Mollica, Ed Carpenter, and Robert Kehlmann. Sowers also stressed that artists in Germany operated as independent designers associating with the established studios as fabricators. He was antithetical to the prevalent system in the United States where the studios retained their own in-house designers to produce essentially commercial stained glass windows. His dissemination of this departure from the norm and his encouragement of younger individual artists was one of his great contributions. It was a stimulating period for the reemergence of stained glass in the 1960s and 1970s as a truly architectural art while simultaneously opening up experimentation in other forms of glass art.

== Work ==
=== American Airlines Terminal ===
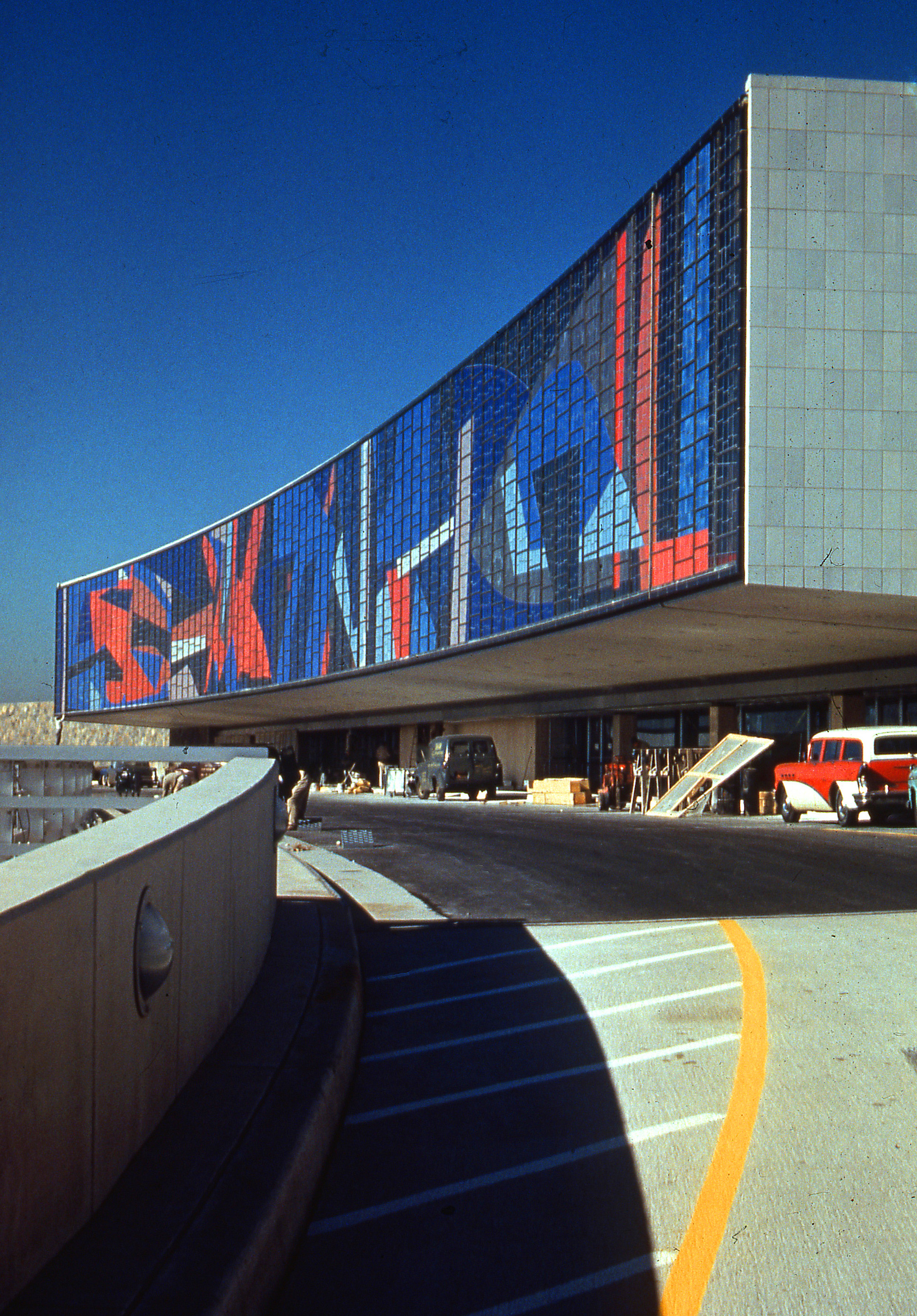
American Airlines Terminal completed stained glass mural, 1960.

The American Airlines project was Sowers' most important commission. Completed in 1960, it was an iconic glass mural 317' long by 23' high covering the entire facade of the building designed by Kahn & Jacobs for what was then Idlewild Airport in Queens, New York - renamed after the Kennedy assassination to John F. Kennedy International Airport. It was composed partially of a German opaque glass that was quite unusual, consisting of both transparent blues and reds on a solid white base. The design was also unusual in that it was seen in its entirety from the exterior as a form of mosaic. Traditionally architectural stained glass was viewed, and therefore designed the other way around, from the inside looking out. Additionally, once inside the terminal it would never be experienced as a whole. Historically early church and cathedral stained glass walls read as dark surfaces, thus the need to utilize dense opaque glass. Additionally, the system was single glazed which meant that the colors were seen to maximum effect as travelers approached the terminal. The idea of developing a reversible image was picked up and pursued by the architect, Percival Goodman, whose projects included many Synagogues. He felt that as a number of services were conducted at nighttime any stained glass should work in some way under reverse conditions. Sowers completed several Synagogue projects for Goodman.

The terminal project was fabricated and installed by the Rambusch Decorating Company in New York, a long established commercial studio where he executed a considerable number of commissions. In the early 1980s, because of frame and moisture issues together with heating and cooling problems inside the building, Rohlf's Stained & Leaded Glass Studio, Mount Vernon, New York was retained to superimpose aluminum framing and tempered glass on the exterior of the existing frame. This resolved those problems but did not improve the outside appearance due to increased surface reflection coming off the new layer of glass. By 2006 when American Airlines was expanding and rebuilding their terminal it was determined that the mural was too big to save. Notice was given for dismantling, removal, and possible destruction. Initial reuse suggestions included making key chains for airline employees but not carried out. This generated a futile movement to preserve it. A group, Save America's Window, was formed to try to retain it as a whole, a daunting and hugely expensive proposition. A hasty email exchange between glass artists who were influenced and indebted to Sowers, glass studios and enthusiasts, Judi Jordan his second wife, and Eileen Vaquilar Clifford a flight attendant for American who had great affection for the artwork, explored all possibilities. These included acquisition by various Museums and Institutions but ultimately there were no viable options, with one minor exception whereby the Airline donated 8 sections to the Madison Museum of Fine Art, Madison, Wisconsin. It was dismantled as salvage by Good Olde Things / Good Olde Glass with individual sections to be sold as mementos.

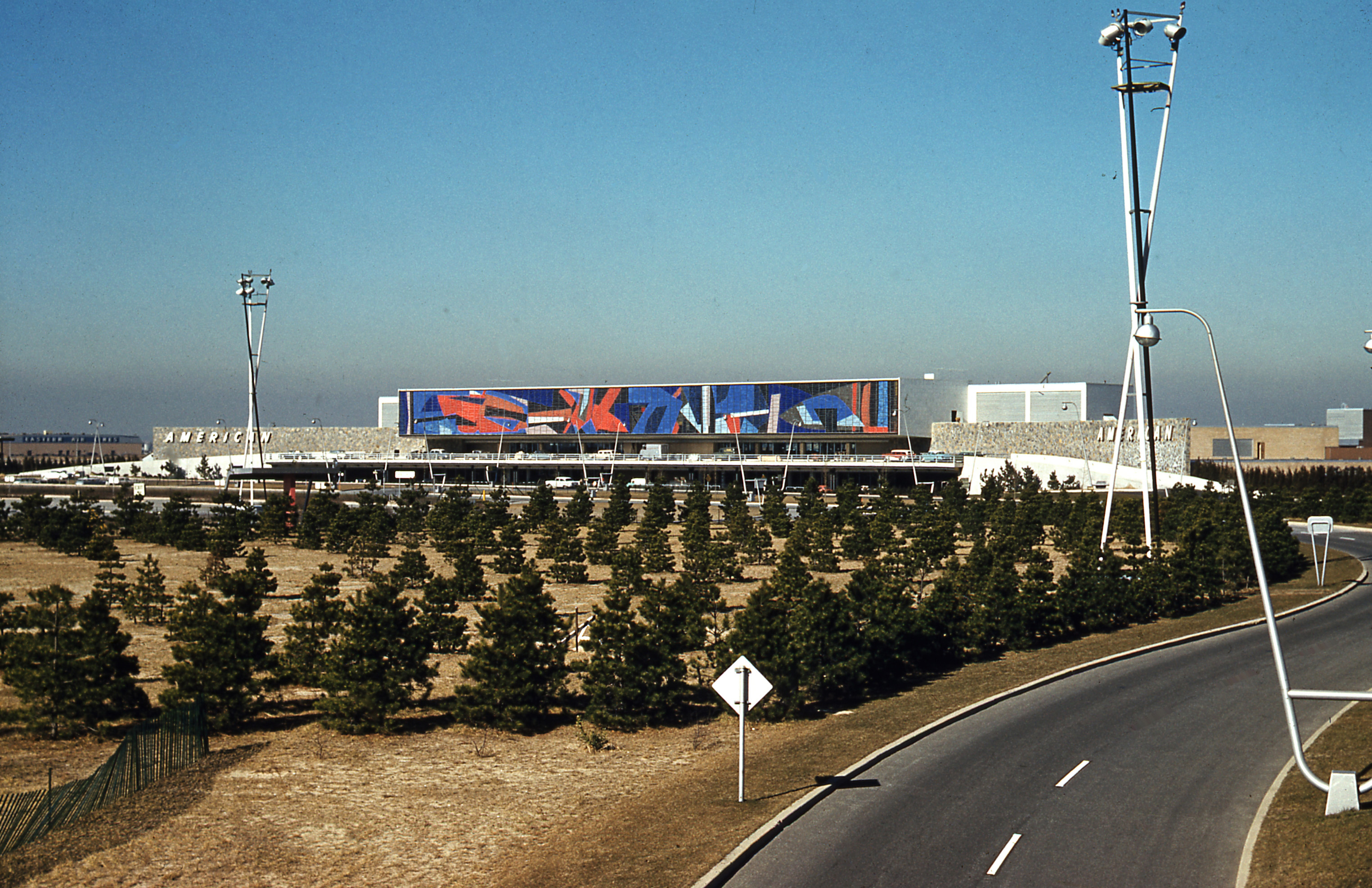
American Airlines Terminal facade, 1960.

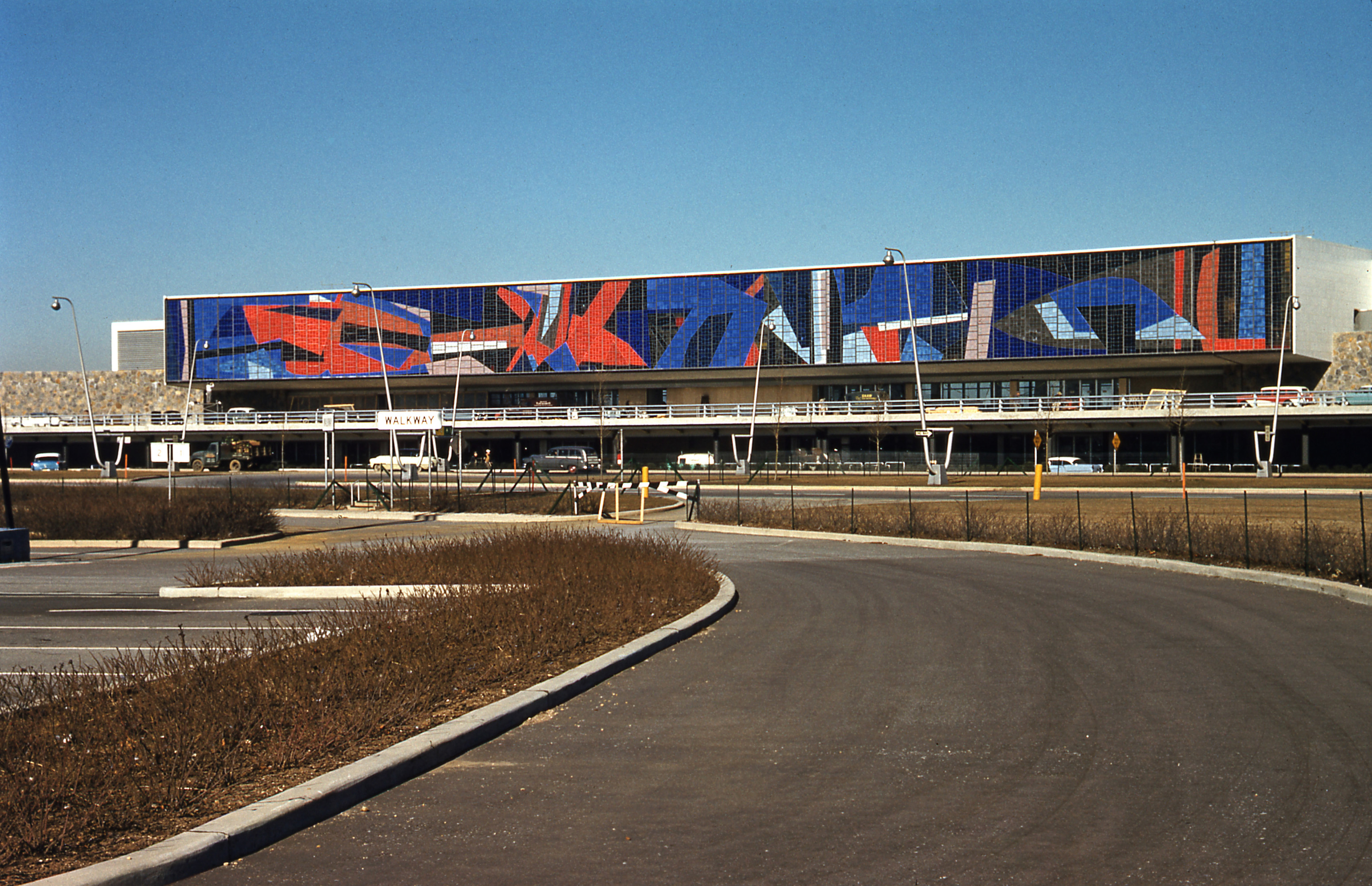
American Airlines Terminal stained glass mural, 1960.

American Airlines Terminal installation.	American Airlines Terminal installation.	Rambusch crew installing sections at American Airlines Terminal.

=== Photography ===
Sowers immersed himself in photography when he first spent time in Europe and it became a way to document his work. Photographing stained glass requires considerable expertise to be successful. This is due to the intense variation in saturation and contrast for which the eye compensates but the camera lens does not. At that time a light meter was of prime importance to average out and bracket film exposure. On one of his trips to Europe he spent time in Chartres Cathedral gauging the intensity of the blue glass and he was astonished by the variation of light value compared to the dilation of the human eye. He also spent time in Germany photographing the work of fellow glass artists primarily for illustrating his books but also for dissemination back home. His photographic work expanded when he took his camera on long walking trips in different parts of the city shooting film in both B/W and 35mm Kodachrome slide format. Sunday wandering included downtown Manhattan and Brooklyn between the bridges when these neighborhoods were essentially deserted. One prime set of these slides were stolen but an extensive archive still exists. For his B/W work he did all his own enlarging and printing.

=== Painting ===
In 1979 Sowers went back his first love of painting full-time. He had moved to a loft building on Degraw Street in Brooklyn where the space and light were perfect. The first canvases were monochromatic in tones of black and white with an abstract expressionistic sensibility which on closer study reveal an architectural reference. From this beginning he introduced color and began working directly from his series of 35mm slides, a result of his photographic exploration of the city in all its varied landscapes of streets, bridges, buildings, trash, junk, people, parks, and gardens. Nothing escaped his eye through the lens. As a glass artist his prime concern had been with light and this was also a preoccupation in his photographs and paintings. The exploration of light, a common thread in these paintings executed in a photorealistic style, represent a clear departure from his work in glass. The canvases uniformly conform to a 40" X 50" format, either vertically or horizontally. They are signed on the back with the date and RWS, one of the few occasions in his professional life that he used his middle initial. In 1988 / 89 he participated in a two-person show at the OK South Gallery in Miami. His death in 1990 coincided with the sale of his first painting, "Stripes", through Ivan Karp's OK Harris Gallery in New York and the publication of his fourth book "Rethinking the Forms of Visual Expression". A number of his paintings have been posthumously placed in private collections.

=== Books and writing ===
Sowers was an ambitious thinker and writer, always wishing to complement his stained-glass art with critical reflection. His ambition shows in his heavily illustrated first book, The Lost Art: A Survey of One Thousand Years of Stained Glass (1954). Sowers drew upon his experience with English stained glass but also reflected on the status of the art as a problem of modernism. Its seriousness is marked by the Preface written by the English modernist scholar, Herbert Read. Around 1960, Sowers was increasingly struck by the tendency to pictorialize stained glass. He sensed that this was symptomatic both of modernism and also an inability to understand the true nature of stained glass. In his "Matisse and Chagall as Craftsmen" published in Craft Horizons in 1962, he reported Matisse's anecdote about his murals for the Barnes Foundation and how mural painting was different from easel painting and must "translate paint into architecture." Matisse had understood that murals serve architecture. But his contemporaries had not learned this lesson and Sowers criticized harshly Chagall's and Rouault's pictorialized stained glass. The greatest failure for stained glass was the church of Assy, decorated by all the old living masters of French art. Sowers would later liken the church, treated by William Rubin in high modernist fashion as a successful collaboration, as so many cadavres exquis. Each artist treated his contribution like a pictorial work that would merely be executed by stained glass specialists. The works were not coordinated to the main building, nor to each other.

In 1965, Sowers published his second major work on stained glass: Stained Glass: An Architectural Art [New York: Universe Books]. Noting the great variety of contemporary artistic and architectural practice, he registered the challenges to cooperation. He clarified that stained glass is an "art of the wall, an art of fenestration" (p. 90) and ought to be hierarchically related to the building in which it is housed. Sowers was not rigid and affirmed that the relative balance of ornament and image "is itself a part of the aesthetic statement" (p. 92). Through his artistic experimentation in the 1970s, Sowers was able to reflect more critically on major aesthetic questions. This coincided with his sensitive reflection on some actual art historical questions and a major aesthetics essay on fundamental modalities. Although the two corresponded for decades, Sowers and Rudolf Arnheim had an intense conversation when Sowers attempted to boil down artistic practice to "A Theory of Primary Modalities in the Visual Arts," published in the Journal of Aesthetics and Art Criticism [1984]. Sowers was challenged by both historical variety but also the latest contemporary art. He argued that there are three primary modalities: the pictorial, the sculptural and the architectural. He did not valorize purity of modality but argued that each was a kind of "center" that organized artistic practice. For example, a sculpture does not indiscriminately grade into architecture because the latter requires habitation. So, an obelisk, for example, visibly pulls between sculpturality – for lack of habitation – and architecture – for scale.

With the encouragement of Arnheim, Sowers continued to develop the ideas in this paper into a book, which became Rethinking the Forms of Visual Experience. He built off of the theory of primaries to return to architecture and stained glass in order to explain succinctly how he thought that stained-glass was an "allied art" of architecture, the art of painting with "structure and light." In 1993, after Sowers’ death, Arnheim positively reviewed the book for Leonardo

=== Major commissions ===
- St George's Church, Durham, New Hampshire. John Carter, Architect, 1955
- Temple Beth Emeth, Albany, New York. Percival Goodman, Architect. 1956
- Stephens College Chapel, Columbia, Missouri. Eero Saarinen, Architect, 1956
- Jewish Community Center, White Plains, New York. Fritz Nathan, Architect, 1956
- Congregation Habonim, New York, New York. Stanley Prowler, Architect, 1957
- Holy Trinity Methodist Church, Danvers, Massachusetts. Carter & Woodruff, Architects, 1957
- Temple Mishkan Tefila, Newton, Massachusetts. Percival Goodman, Architect, 1958
- American Airlines Terminal, John F. Kennedy International Airport, New York. Kahn & Jacobs, Architects, 1959
- Temple Sholom, Greenwich, Connecticut, 1959
- Holy Redeemer Church, West Lebanon, New Hampshire. W. Brooke Fleck, Architect, 1960
- Bankers Trust Company, New York, New York. Henry Dreyfuss, Architect, 1962
- Capitol Park, Washington DC. Chloetheil Smith, Architect, 1965
- Holy Trinity Church, New York, New York. Philip Ives, Architect, 1965
- All Saints Episcopal Church, Palo Alto, California. William Garwood, Architect, 1966
- St Michael's Church, San Francisco, California. Roger Ranuio, Architect, 1967
- First Presbyterian Church, New Canaan, Connecticut. Philip Ives, Architect, 1968
- Church of the Epiphany, New York, New York. Philip Ives, Architect, 1969
- Church of St James the Less, Scarsdale, New York. Philip Ives, Architect, 1969
- Stephen Wise Free Synagogue, New York, New York. 1975
- Cathedral of the Immaculate Conception (Burlington, Vermont). Edward Larrabee Barnes, Architect. 1976

== Gallery ==
=== Photographs ===
Brooklyn Bridge, B/W, 8 x 10.	De Kooning, B/W, 8 x 10.	No Dumping, B/W, 8 x 10.	Nixon, B/W, 8 x 10.	The El, B/W, 8 x 10.
Central Park, 35mm slide.	Daffodil Hill, Prospect Park, 35mm slide.	Dogs in Central Park, 35mm slide.	Central Park couple, 35mm slide.	Dump Art, 35mm slide.

=== Paintings ===
"Stripes". 1987.	"Tanglewood #1". 1986.	"Dogs and Company". 1987.	"Triangle". 1988.	"Dump Art". 1985.
"Red Fire Plug". 1984.	"Tanglewood #2". 1986.	"East Village Bar". 1985.	"Come to Christ".1985.	B/W abstraction. 1979-82
