= Gregory Perkel =

Ukrainian-born American conceptual artist

- Григорий Перкель; Григорій Перкель
- Born: May 3, 1939 (age 87); Vinnytsia, Ukrainian SSR, Soviet Union
- Education: Moscow State Pedagogical Institute
- Spouse: Natasha Perkel
- Website: gregoryperkelstudio.com

Gregory Perkel (Russian: Григорий Зульевич Перкель; born May 3, 1939) is a Ukrainian-born American conceptual artist. Perkel was born in Vinnytsa (Ukraine) in what was then the Ukrainian SSR of the Soviet Union. After the end of World War II, he and his family moved to Moscow in 1946, and he graduated from the Fine Art and Graphic Department of the Moscow State Pedagogical Institute in 1964. In 1977, he emigrated to the United States along with his wife Natasha Perkel and his daughter. Perkel currently lives and works in New Jersey.

== Career ==
Perkel made a living creating book illustrations and posters for movies, theaters and the circus, and in 1969, he became a member of the Union of Soviet Artists. In 1970, Perkel embarked upon a four-year creative effort to produce a series of three separate lithograph albums, each of which with its own theme. The first album was inspired by the short stories penned by the classic Jewish writer Shalom-Aleichem and was intentionally designed to drew attention to (what was considered by some to be) deeply rooted anti-Semitism inherent in the Russian government during that era. Professor Matthew Baigell writes about these lithographs in his article entitled, Soviet Artists, Jewish Images which was featured in the book, Jewish Dimensions in Modern Visual Culture and wherein Baigell states, “One of the most important series of works based on Shalom-Aleichem literature is the suite of 19 lithographs completed in the early 1970’s by Gregory Perkel.”

In 1973, Perkel collaborated with the theater director Felix Berman as the stage and costume designer for the first Jewish musical performed in the USSR called "The Bewitched Tailor" which was performed at the Moscow Jewish Theater.

== American Period ==
Perkel's first gallery show was held in March 1978 at the Eduard Nakhamkin Fine Arts Gallery (New York) and it sold-out completely to Norton Dodge. Dodge was one of the United States’ most distinguished collectors of Soviet nonconformist art at the time, and later donated his entire collection to the Zimmerli Art Museum at Rutgers University.

In 1981, Perkel was invited to participate in a “Russian New Wave” exhibition which showcased the works by Ernst Neizvestny, Mihail Chemiakin, Oleg Tselkov and Igor Tulpanov. This show was organized through the combined efforts of Eduard Nakhamkin Fine Arts and Norton Dodge and was open to the public between December 4, 1981 – February 7, 1982, and was located at 599 Broadway, New York City. Perkel presented large installation entitled, “Totems, Parts and Obsession” showcasing 56 oil paintings. John Russell covered the exhibition in The New York Times Review. From the conclusion of the “Russian New Wave” show up until the end of 1989, Perkel started to work in an artform that he calls “Conglomerates” which consists of the combination of multiple mixed-media artworks assembled into one unified work displayed on a wall. A collection of his Conglomerates was exhibited in February 1987 at Mokotoff Gallery, along with a series of 12 paintings entitled, Plagued Myth depicting scenes from biblical myth overlaid with inscriptions from contemporary advertisements.

Over a two-year period starting in 1990, Perkel worked on an installation dubbed, Trade, Pray and Relax Over A Coffin Table. This installation introduced a media that Perkel that he refers to as “Cardboard Mosaic”, given that such works are comprised exclusively of cutouts from conventional commercial corrugated cardboard containers and packaging that are glued to plywood. The inaugural exhibition of his Cardboard Mosaic works took place in 1993 at the Frank Bustamante Gallery in Soho, NY. The show was reviewed by Amei Wallach for News Day.

In 1995, Perkel showcased his installation entitled Pieces from an Archive at O.K. Harris Works of Art, New York City. O.K Harris Works of Art was opened by Ivan Karp in SoHo in 1969. Perkel's follow-up show at O.K. Harris Works of Art, The Raft of Inspiration, came two years later, in 1997, and was dedicated to people who inspired him throughout his life. This included his grandfather, Nahum Perkel, who perished during the holocaust and who was acknowledged with piece named “Yizkor” This show was reviewed by J. Bowyer Bell in the November 1997 edition of the magazine “REVIEW”. Corporaria Land, The Raft of Inspiration Perkel's third installation debuted at the O.K. Harris Works of Art in May 2002, and was called, Pyramid Mall/Shopping Spree From Pyramid To Christmas Tree and served as a satire mocking the American consumer obsession with acquiring “things”. Roberta Smith reviewed the show in The New York Times. Elements from that exhibition were later exhibited at the New Jersey's Hunterdon Museum of Art under the title, Manuscripts of the Cardboard Culture. Dan Bischoff reviewed the exhibition for Star-Ledger.

In late 2002 Perkel moved away from cardboard and returned to oil painting. In 2006, Perkel showcased Warehouse, a colossally vast, floor-to-ceiling installation consisting of 168 paintings at O.K. Harris Works of Art, New York. “Dream Dinner for Twelve”, a part of Perkel's larger work entitled “Temple for the Eaten Products”, was exhibited at O.K. Harris Works of Art in 2013.

In 2015, Perkel started working on a cross-media installation entitled Savonarola Suite, which relied upon photographic and moving imagery of the real-time burning of a complete 40 years’ worth of the magazines' Art in America and Art News. The installation necessitated the creation by Perkel of a special, fire-resistant steel sculpture which he dubbed “Savonarola” (in honor of the 15th Century Florentine monk of the same name) to hold the magazines during the blazing combustion. The performance art aspect of the project involved two parts, with the first being a laborious, meticulous paging-through of each monthly edition, which resulted in 40 hours of video. The second element of the Savonarola Suite project entailed the complete destruction-by-burning of all 700 magazines one by one, which resulted in months of editing and 18 hours of video. The Savonarola Suite was premiered at the Pulse Art Fair in Miami by Black & White Gallery / Project Space and Perkeland in December 2019.

Perkel has had five solo exhibitions at the O.K. Harris : "Pieces from an Archive" in 1995, "The Raft of Inspiration" in 1997, "Pyramid Mall" in 2002, "Warehouse" in 2006, "Dream Dinner for Twelve" in 2013 and in 2019 exhibited the "Savonarola Suite Installation" at Black & White Gallery / Project Space, Pulse Art Fair, 2019, Miami, Florida.

== Selected public collections ==
• The State Tretyakov Gallery, Moscow.

• Zimmerli Art Museum, Rutgers University, New Jersey.

• Judah L. Magnes Museum, Berkeley, California.

• New Britain Museum of American Art, New Britain, Connecticut.

• Kolodzei Art Foundation, USA.
