= Putney Hospital =

Public hospital in London, England

Coordinates: 51.469011°N 0.228598°W

Putney Hospital was a public hospital in the London Borough of Wandsworth, west of Putney town centre.

== Site history ==
The hospital site had an area of 1.23 hectares and in the late 19th century was occupied by two detached houses, The Elms and West Lodge, the second of which was where comic writer Douglas William Jerrold lived from 1844 to 1852: his name is lent to an existing residential building, Jerrold Lodge, nearby on Commondale.

== Founding ==
In 1900 Mr Henry Chester left £75,000 in his will for a general hospital in the parish, Sir William Lancaster (co-founder of Putney School of Art and Design) purchased the two houses and donated land for a new hospital and after negotiation on the capacity of the proposed building it opened with 53 beds on 1 July 1912.

== Further development ==
The building was extended from 1926 to increase capacity to 75 beds; Princess Arthur of Connaught opened the new wings on 30 April 1934, and nurses' accommodation was also built.

During the Second World War the nurses' home was struck by a V-1 flying bomb on 14 August 1944, the London County Council Bomb Damage Map (1945) shows the buildings were damaged and 'doubtful if repairable', but thankfully no-one was injured.

The Hospital joined the National Health Service on its founding in 1948, under the Battersea and Putney Group Hospital Management Committee, part of the South West Metropolitan Regional Hospital Board.

The Mackenzie Morris Ward, named after a popular matron of the Putney Hospital and the Sydney Turner Ward, opened in 1961 and 1962, along with a Casualty and Outpatients departments, there were plans to develop the hospital further but these were later abandoned.

After the National Health Service Reorganisation Act 1973 the hospital was transferred to the Roehampton District Health Authority in 1974, part of the South West Thames Regional Health Authority.

== Closure ==
The closure of Putney Hospital was announced in 1998 and services were transferred to Queen Mary's Roehampton, where there is a Sydney Turner ward for intermediate care. The hospital finally closed in 2002.

== New buildings on the site ==
Initial plans were to transform the building into a community surgery merging multiple local GP surgeries; however, this was not pursued and the building was subsequently demolished in 2012. Construction on a school and neighbouring residential buildings on the site started in 2013 carried out by Durkan. The Oasis Academy primary school opened Autumn 2016, the neighbouring residential house of 24 flats is called 'Henry Chester', after the original legacy giver for the site.

== Inquiry over sale of land ==
The new school and residential buildings required a new access road to be built from the Lower Richmond Road; this led to protests from local residents. The road was built on Putney Lower Common land entrusted to the Wimbledon and Putney Commons Conservators, under the 1871 Wimbledon and Putney Commons Act.

Land for the road was found to have been sold by the Conservators to Wandsworth Borough Council for £350,000, £1.5m less than a valuation by a surveyor in 2012 of £1.9m. This led to a Charity Commission Statutory Inquiry of the Conservators from 2016, the results of which were reported in 2020, which concluded that the sale of land or 'easement' may have been transferred at an undervalue. The Putney MP Fleur Anderson called the inquiry 'a whitewash', the WPCC Chief Executive retired from their position early, in December 2020.

== Popular culture ==
Hospital scenes in the 1962 film Emergency were filmed at the hospital, as were exterior scenes in the 1990 film Nuns on the Run, starring Eric Idle and Robbie Coltrane.
