= W. S. Cowell Ltd. =

Defunct British printing company

W.S. Cowell Ltd was a British printing company that produced a variety of books, including popular children's literature of the 1930s and prestigious coffee table books. Established in 1818, the company played a significant role in the history of printing in Ipswich. The company developed the Plastocowell printing process. However after a number of mergers in the late twentieth century, the name was finally dropped by its corporate owners in 1988.

== Origins ==
Samuel Harrison Cowell was taken on as an apprentice by Richard Nottingham Rose, who had a printing/bookselling business in the Buttermarket, Ipswich. In 1818, Abraham Kersey Cowell, a corn merchant from Ipswich, England, set up his second son, as a printer and stationer at No 10 in the Buttermarket in Ipswich. As well as selling books, Samuel Cowell also sold tea, coffee and wine.

== W. S. Cowell inherits ==
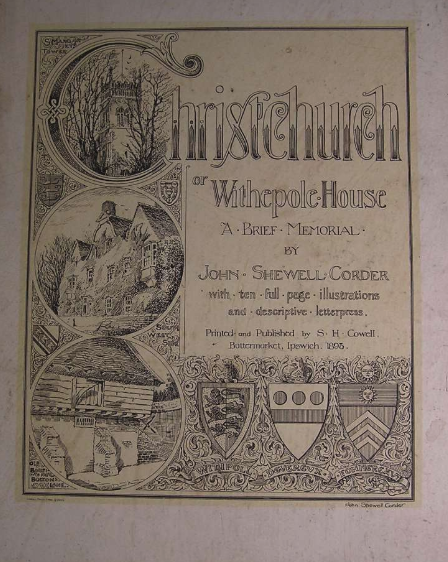
Cover of Christchurch or Withepole House: A Brief Memorial printed and published by S. H. Cowell, 1893

In 1875, Walter Samuel Cowell inherited the business and appointed W. B. Hanson to handle the printing work. When the firm was incorporated in 1900, both W. B. Hanson and his son H. Hanson had significant share holdings.

== Christchurch postcard series ==
William S. Cowell started publishing postcards launching their Christchurch series. These included illustrations by Parsons Norman and Robert Gallon

== The Hanson era ==
When W. S. Cowell died in 1923, the Hanson family acquired the business. At that time, it contained a retail store, a bar, a wine and spirits business and the printing works. During the 1930s, the W.S. Cowell firm printed children's book series such as Babar the Elephant, Little Tim and Orlando. The firm was able to offer high colour printing. W. S. Cowell printed prestigious works such as The Queen's Stamps and The Wild Flowers of America. They also printed books with high quality prints for the publishers, Robert Hale Ltd, including Cecil Keeling's Pictures of Persia, a book which contained the authors memoirs from his wartime service there, alongside 30 colour plates.

== Subsequent developments ==
In 1963, Grampian Holdings acquired W. S. Cowell Ltd. E. H. Hanson and R. G. Smith continued to manage the company until 1968. The printing operations were moved out of the Buttermarket to Lovetofts Drive in 1986. In 1988 the company merged with San Serif Ltd. and the name W. S. Cowell Ltd. was dropped.

In 2022, artists including Kathleen Hale, Eric Ravilious, Edward Ardizzone, Hilary Stebbing, Pablo Picasso, and Henri Matisse were included in the exhibition "Picture Books For All: The Fine Printing of W. S. Cowell Ltd." at The Hold heritage centre in Ipswich.
