= John Baker (stained glass artist) =

British artist (1916–2007)

- Born: 11 March 1916; Birmingham, U.K.
- Died: 20 December 2007 (aged 91); Hastings, U.K.
- Education: Central School of Art and Design
- Spouse: Hilary Stebbing

John 'Jack' Baker (1916-2007) was a British stained-glass artist, teacher, conservator and author.

== Biography ==
He was a student at the Central School of Arts and Crafts in the late 1930s, where he was a contemporary of Monica Walker and the artist, illustrator and children's author Hilary Stebbing, whom he married in 1946. He worked under James Hogan at the Whitefriars Glass before joining Samuel Caldwell junior at Canterbury Cathedral in 1948 to help reinstate the medieval glass removed for safekeeping during the Second World War.

== Teaching ==
Baker taught stained glass at the Central School of Arts and Crafts from 1951, where in 1953-54 he ran the stained glass department with Tom Fair, and his pupils included Robert Sowers and Margaret Traherne. From 1963 he taught at Kingston College of Art.

His work was exhibited at The Architectural Association in January 1956.

== Stained glass, mosaic & sculpture ==
- 1957, Church of the Holy Name, Bow Common Lane, Mile End: 11 windows
- 1958, St Michaels Convent, Finchley: large mosaic in entrance hall
- 1958, Little St Peter, Cricklewood: two windows and a brick sculpture (The church no longer exists.)
- 1959, St Anne's, East Wittering: eighteen windows
- 1959, Broomfield Chapel, Abbots Langley: two large abstract windows
- 1959, Austin Reed, Regent Street, London: six glass and aluminium panels
- 1960, Our Lady, St Mary of Walsingham, London Colney: 10 large concrete and glass windows
- 1960, St George, Britwell: Tree of Jesse (The 1960 church was replaced in the early 2000s, but some of the side panels of the Jesse window are incorporated in the new church.)
- 1964, Holy Cross Church, Gleadless Valley: 10 large concrete and glass windows, including full height windows of the Virgin Mary and St John
- 1965, Chapel, St Michaels Convent, Finchley: 22 concrete and glass windows—the school website includes photographs
- 1965–1973, Holy Trinity Cathedral, Auckland, New Zealand: windows for the Marsden Chapel and large window in the transept
- Canterbury Cathedral: St Stephen's Chapel, in memory of Lang Fisk-Moore, Canterbury
- St Mary, Ide Hill, Sevenoaks: Nativity, east window
- The King's School, Canterbury, library
- St Mary's, Climping: a stylised Madonna and child
- Burgher's Chapel, Sheffield Cathedral

== Dalle de verre ==
From 1960 to 1965, Baker created a number of dalle de verre windows in churches and chapels, setting slab glass in concrete or resin: Our Lady, St Mary of Walsingham, London Colney (1960); St George, Britwell (1964); Holy Cross Church, Gleadless Valley (1964); St Michaels Convent, Finchley (1965).

== Publications ==
- 'Secular stained glass', The Architectural Association Journal, December 1955, p. 120
- English Stained Glass with an introduction by Herbert Read and photographs by Alfred Lammer, Thames & Hudson, London, 1960
- English Stained Glass of the Medieval Period (revised edition of the above), Thames & Hudson, London, 1978
