= OK Harris Gallery =

Coordinates: 40°43′25.71″N 74°0′8.56″W

The OK Harris Gallery was an art gallery located at 383 West Broadway in SoHo, New York City. The gallery closed in 2014. Founded by longtime art dealer Ivan Karp after leaving the Leo Castelli gallery in 1969 where he had worked as gallery co-director for nearly 10 years. Karp opened his own gallery called the OK Harris Gallery in SoHo (which at the time was one of the first galleries in the newest gallery district in New York City).

Previously located at 465 West Broadway, in the early 1970s it hosted exhibits by emerging artists as well as well known veteran artists.

== History ==
Ivan C. Karp was a co-director of Leo Castelli Gallery from 1959 to 1969. In 1969 he broke away and founded OK Harris in the SoHo district of Manhattan. Karp chose the fictitious OK Harris name as it "sounded like the name of an American riverboat gambler." As the second gallery on West Broadway (following Paula Cooper who had opened in SoHo in 1968) OK Harris was instrumental in the area's development as a center of fine arts.

In addition to being at the forefront of the Photorealism movement in 1969, OK Harris was among the first galleries to exhibit the work of Duane Hanson, Deborah Butterfield, Manny Farber, Richard Pettibone, Robert Cottingham, Robert Bechtle, Marilyn Levine, Nancy Rubins, Malcolm Morley, Luis Jiminez, Jake Berthot, Jack Goldstein, Porfirio DiDonna, Al Souza, Gregory Perkel.

OK Harris exhibited contemporary art and photography, and on occasion mounted shows of antiques and collectibles. In its capacious 8000 square foot space, it was able to mount up to five one-person shows simultaneously and has multiple such exhibitions in the course of a year. The gallery maintained a complete photographic archive on its exhibitions from the time of its inception, freely available to students and scholars for research.

During the early 1970s it hosted exhibits by Alan Vega, some of which were advertised as "Punk Music" predating the later Punk rock by some years.
