= Jake Berthot =

American painter

- Jake Berthot, 2006
- Born: John Alex Berthot; March 30, 1939; Niagara Falls, N.Y., Pennsylvania
- Died: December 30, 2014 (aged 75)

Jake Berthot (1939–2014) was an American artist whose abstract paintings contained elements of both the minimalist and expressionist styles. During the first 36 years of his career his paintings were entirely non-figurative. His style changed in 1995 when he moved his studio from New York City to a rural community in upstate New York. While continuing to be abstract his paintings thereafter contained figurative elements and were seen to have greater emotional content. Throughout his career his work frequently appeared in solo and group exhibitions in both commercial and public galleries. It has been collected by the Museum of Modern Art, Metropolitan Museum of Art, Guggenheim Museum, National Gallery of Art, and other major American art museums. He received a Guggenheim Fellowship in 1981 and a National Endowment for the Arts grant in 1983.

== Early life and training ==
Berthot was born on March 30, 1939, in Niagara Falls, New York, and, from age two, was raised on a truck farm in Clearfield, Pennsylvania, 175 miles to the south. As a child, he received his first drawing lessons from his maternal grandmother who was also his primary caregiver. Having completed his education at local public schools, he briefly enrolled in a commercial art school in Pittsburgh before moving on to New York where, from 1960 to 1962, he attended evening classes at Pratt Institute and from 1960 to 1961 at the New School for Social Research. Berthot later credited a Pratt instructor, Hank Raleigh, with getting him a start as a professional painter. The classes he took gave him relatively little grounding in the technique or history of art, but he learned much from hours spent in museums. He also learned much from other artists, particularly Milton Resnick who, as he later said, took him under his wing and "through his friendship and guidance I became more aware of the real possibility of painting."

== Career ==
=== Artistic style ===
Jake Berthot, "Lovella's Thing," 1969, acrylic on shaped canvas, 84 x 72 inches

Berthot began his career making abstract paintings in the minimalist tradition. He would apply a thick painterly surface to large shaped canvases that were seen to employ the reductive means of minimalism, but expressing instead of restraining emotion. Despite its simplicity of means, his work was said to deal "more in feelings than in analysis." Painted in 1969, "Lovella's Thing" is a good example of his style at this time. Shortly before his death, Berthot explained the way in which it evolved: "With Lovella's Thing I originally thought of painting the middle a flat, blank color, but when I got into it, putting down a lot of acrylic washes, I just started to paint it in a more felt way. So it became a kind of dialect between something very concrete and something very felt. I liked the blunt presence the shape had on the wall and then penetrating the surface in the middle in what I suppose could be called a Rothkoesque kind of way."

In the mid-1970s Berthot's style evolved. His work continued to have a painterly, lyrical quality, but he added bright colors to the muted palette of earlier work and introduced rectangular bars and ovals into canvases that were now simple rectangles. Regarding the bars, he later said that he worked to uncover the tension points, or focal points, that were inherent in the vertical and horizontal axes of a grid. He said he sought "a balance between the object and the opening," and thereby "to gradually achieve balance between my two influences: the systemic and the felt." "Yellow Bar With Red," of 1977 is typical of paintings in this period. Another well-known painting from this period, "Walken's Ridge," 1975-1976, is somewhat unusual. Although a pure abstraction, it has the size and shape of Monet's Water Lily paintings—14 feet wide in two equal sections— and has, as Berthot said, the feel of a landscape. (Note: Regarding the painting's design he said: "I was concerned about getting to the middle of the canvas. That seemed to be the biggest problem in painting at the time, including my painting. I started thinking about it and decided to try putting some kind of form in the middle — to just do the same things I'd been doing but reverse it. Rather than having the bars on the outside, I would create an internal situation; rather than having the void in the middle, I would move it out to the sides.")

Jake Berthot, "Walken's Ridge," 1975-1976, oil on canvas mounted on wood, two panels, 60.125 x 152.7 inches overall

During the 1980s Berthot began to exhibit etchings and drawings along with his paintings. The drawings were often graphite on a background of a gray enamel. The lines frequently formed ovoid shapes and were accompanied by quasi-calligraphic markings. A critic said this work contained a "poetic lyricism" that could be accessed "not at a cognitive level but at a more elemental, intuitive one." Berthot later told an interviewer that in it "gradually feeling began to predominate." The paintings of this period continued to employ ovals and rectangles in canvases on which the "materiality of pigment," as one critic noted, produced "a highly tactile surface." Another critic wrote that "the shimmering, encrusted surfaces of the 'ovals' are reminiscent of Claude Monet's late Waterlilies. The use of gold with deep reds and bright blues recall Medieval icons." Of his work at this time, Berthot said: "I try to break the code of painting and let it take on its own life without any code."

Jake Berthot, "Hard Line," 1980-1983, oil on linen, 60 x 50 inches

During the early 1990s, Berthot continued to employ bars and ovals in paintings. Of this period in his career, Berthot later said, "I reached another point where the idea was closing in on itself, there was too much idea; the paintings started to feel too literal, too much like a figure in space. I wanted something more organic, more felt." He said that he wanted to "make the painting something you experience rather than just see." His "Hard Line" of 1980-83 is an early example of this approach, showing a rectangle in a muted background having bright accents that a critic said were and unexpected fiery flame. In 1994, Pepe Karmel, writing in the New York Times, said of works like these: "Despite the lack of recognizable imagery, the paintings seem haunted by a nostalgia for representation." The oval shape appears as well in Berthot's drawings and etchings of this period some of which had representational content, including most often an ovoid skull.

Apart from a brief period spent in Maine, Berthot had lived in New York City from the time he moved there in 1959 until the day in 1994 when he moved his home and studio about 100 miles north of the city to a rural spot in Ulster County along the Hudson Valley in the foothills of the Catskill Mountains. At this time he made a gradual transition from abstract paintings that had no clear subject to ones that, while continuing to be abstract in character, had the natural environment as their subject. (Note: In 1998 a critic explained this transition:"Jake Berthot, long a master of abstraction, has moved to the country and started painting forests.... In a sense, Berthot begins, as he always has, with abstraction. He pencils a skeleton of grids and crosshatches over his canvas, a construction of lines that builds into something almost three-dimensional, like a blueprint of the universe.... Berthot's taste for abstraction hasn't left him. His fields of paint shift and move, full of questions and implications. The trees almost fight the colors around them, asserting their noble presences in great fogs of paint. Springing from their gridlike backgrounds, they trumpet their organic shapes, but don't deny their kinship to the abstract.") Of this transition, Berthot said: "Even though my work now is landscape-based, it is more abstract than it was a few years ago. It is dealing with the space in the middle. At first I was painting the volume of the tree in space. Next, what I felt was that space itself has volume. And now, it is the light that has volume." The painting, "Chapel Trail Near Alter Road" shows the direction that his work took at this time. His drawings similarly enlarged the scope of their subjects as the untitled tree drawing of 2002 shows. (Note: In 2006 Berthot, who was right-handed, fell from a ladder while pruning a tree seriously injuring his right wrist. While it was mending he was unable to paint as usual and later said that the loss of dexterity was a useful obstacle for him to try to overcome.)

Jake Berthot, "Chapel Trail Near Alter Road," 2000, oil on panel, 26.675 x 26.125 inches

Throughout his career, Berthot consciously kept aloof from the labeled art movements of his time. He once said, "I am not interested in the new but in trying to make paintings that refuse to grow old," and on another occasion, speaking of an affinity he felt with Cézanne's approach to his work, he said: "His clear method ... is not a closure but an opening.... You have to have a form and method and within that form and method, at a certain point you have to become the servant of the painting." Summing up this attitude on another occasion he said that as he worked a time would come when he felt that a painting would take over his consciousness "to dictate what it wanted to be." His paintings were his companions as well as the focus of his life. When the Phillips Collection asked to mount a major retrospective of combining the many works of his that it owned along with the work then in his studio, he declined saying he could not live without having the paintings around him. (Note: As noted below, Berthot bequeathed the paintings in his studio to the Phillips Collection, which, after his death, did mount a large retrospective exhibit of the works in its collection with those it had been bequeathed.)

Jake Berthot, "Night Wood and Rock," 2012-2014, oil on linen, 20.5 x 24.5 inches

During the course of his career critics had pointed to an increasing emotional impact in his paintings and one or two of them had said that while the paintings could be comprehended entirely on their own merits, it was possible to see in them Berthot's responses to the personal difficulties he encountered over the years of his career. (Note: One critic noted "shifts in feeling" in his work at the time of his separation from his first wife, his move to Maine, and the theft of some of his paintings, saying these events could partially explain the "contentious attitude" of this work.) While he was undergoing treatment for leukemia during the last few years of his life, Berthot produced paintings that have been seen to possess a high level of emotional content. Writing in 2015, a friend of his, the artist Elisa Jensen, referred to them as "haunting, haunted, living, breathing, and absolutely undeniably alive." (Note: Berthot seems to have understood this himself. In a 2006 interview he said that his work changed after 1987 so that it subsequently had "more to do with simultaneity of feeling and seeing that leads to thought, rather than thought leading to feeling.".) Concerning one of them, called "Night, Wood, and Rock," a friend said it was "pure essence, stripped of all inessentials," and that his close observation of it infused him with a "serene acceptance of life's glory, suspended always above death, no matter death's imminence or seeming finality."

=== Exhibitions and awards ===
Berthot's earliest exhibitions were at the Feiner, Park Place, and O.K. Harris galleries (Note: The O.K. Harris Gallery, also known as OK Harris Works of Art, was one of the first galleries located in the area called SoHo south of Houston Street in Manhattan. Operated by Ivan Karp between 1969 and 2014, it aimed "to exhibit the broadest spectrum of the most adventuresome art being offered." Run by a sister of Milton Resnick, the Feiner Gallery was located at 42 5th Avenue in New York.) and the Jewish and Whitney museums in New York. He was given solo shows at the Feiner Gallery, 42 Fifth Avenue, in 1963, and the O.K. Harris Gallery, 465 West Broadway, in 1970, and was included in group exhibitions at the Jewish Museum, in 1970, the Whitney Museum, in 1971. Before showing at O.K. Harris Berthot had been supporting himself as an art instructor. He later said the gallery's owner, Ivan Karp had enabled him to work full-time in his studio by giving him a living allowance equal to his teaching salary.

During the 1970s he exhibited frequently in commercial galleries and museums. He was given a solo show at O.K. Harris in 1975, appeared in a charity exhibition at the Cayman Gallery in 1977, was selected to appear in a show called "Artists Choose Artists" at the CDS Gallery (1982), and appeared in a solo exhibition at the McKee Gallery (1983). In addition, paintings of his appeared in shows at the Whitney Museum Downtown Branch (1974), Corcoran Gallery (1975), Baltimore Museum of Art (1975), Venice Biennale (1976), Aldrich Museum (1978), Brockton Art Museum (1980), and the Hudson River Museum (1983).

During the 1980s Berthot continued to show at the McKee Gallery. He also showed at the Cava Gallery, Philadelphia, in 1987 and the Nielson Gallery, Boston, in 1998 and 2000. During this time his work continued to appear in museum exhibitions including the Museum of Modern Art. The Museum of Modern Art included works by Berthot in "New Works on Paper" (1981), "An International Survey of Recent Painting and Sculpture" (1984), and "Contrasts of Form: Geometric Abstract Art, 1910-1980" (1985). His work was also included in exhibitions at the Berkeley Art Museum (1984), the galleries of Muhlenberg and Lafayette colleges (1984), Mandeville Gallery, University of California, San Diego (1986), the Museum of Contemporary Art San Diego, and the Museum of Fine Arts, Boston (1987). In 1988 he was given a retrospective exhibition at the Rose Art Museum, Brandeis University.

Until about 2004 he continued to be represented by the McKee Gallery and thereafter by the Betty Cunningham Gallery which, since his death, has also represented his estate. Museum exhibitions from the early 1990s include: "Slow Art: Painting in New York Now" at P.S.1, Long Island City, New York (1992), "Square Painting/Plane Painting at the Center on Contemporary Art, Seattle, Washington (1997), "Jake Berthot" at the Phillips Collection (1998), "Against The Grain" at Museum of Modern Art (2006), an exhibition at Hood Museum of Art, Dartmouth (2009), an exhibition at the gallery of SUNY Ulster (2010), and "Jake Berthot: From the Collection and Promised Gifts" at the Phillips Collection (2016).

Berthot's works are owned by the Museum of Modern Art, Metropolitan Museum of Art, Whitney Museum of American Art, Guggenheim Museum, National Gallery of Art, Houston Museum of Fine Arts, and the Berkeley Art Museum and Pacific Film Archive. Not long before he died, he bequeathed the paintings that remained in his studio to the Phillips Collection. He received a Guggenheim Fellowship in 1981, and a National Endowment for the Arts Grant in 1983.

== Art teacher ==
While Berthot was in evening school at Pratt, a teacher asked him to take over a class for another teacher who had not shown up. He did well enough so that he was offered a job in the fall of 1961. He later said he liked the work partly because it required him to tell people what to do, "rather than them telling me what to do." Berthot subsequently taught classes at Cooper Union (1974–81), Yale University (1982-92), the University of Pennsylvania (1993) and the School of Visual Arts (1994 -2013).

== Personal life and family ==
Berthot was born on March 30, 1939, in Niagara Falls, New York. His father was Earl H. Berthot (1911–1962) and his mother Sara Catherine Barr Berthot (1912–2002). His birth name was John Alex Berthot. When he was two years old his parents separated and his mother took him to her parents' eight-acre truck farm in Clearfield, Pennsylvania. (Note: Berthot later said he understood that the separation took place because his father was abusive and because he had abandoned his mother and himself.) At this time his grandmother, Cora Barr (1887–1969) became his primary caregiver. His grandfather, Thomas Barr (1886–1967), owned and worked the farm. Including Sara, his grandparents had three of their eleven children living with them when she returned home. The youngest of them was thirteen years older than Berthot and in that rural setting he had no companions his own age. The farm was self-sufficient but austere; there was electricity but no indoor plumbing. Before her marriage Cora had a relationship with a boyfriend who was an artist. She encouraged Berthot's early interest in drawing.

He went through the public school system where he lived and afterwards attended a commercial art school in Pittsburgh. At the age of 20 in 1959, he moved to New York City, enrolled in a school to learn window display, and got a job in that occupation in a store in the Bronx. Shortly afterwards, he married his first wife, the poet, Ginny MacKenzie, whose job, teaching at Pratt Institute, enabled him to take evening art classes there. In the early 1980s he and MacKenzie divorced and he moved briefly to Maine. Sometime later he married Kristin Flynn and some years later they too divorced.

In 2006, 11 years after his move to the rural home and studio in Accord, N.Y., Berthot seriously injured his right wrist when he fell from a ladder while pruning a tree and about six years after that he was diagnosed with a virulent form of leukemia from which he did not recover. He died on December 30, 2014.

Other names used

Named John Alex Berthot at birth, he used Jake Berthot as his professional name all his life. His surname is pronounced BEAR-TOE.
