= The Herdings =

House in Sheffield, South Yorkshire, England

Coordinates: 53°20′35″N 1°26′14″W

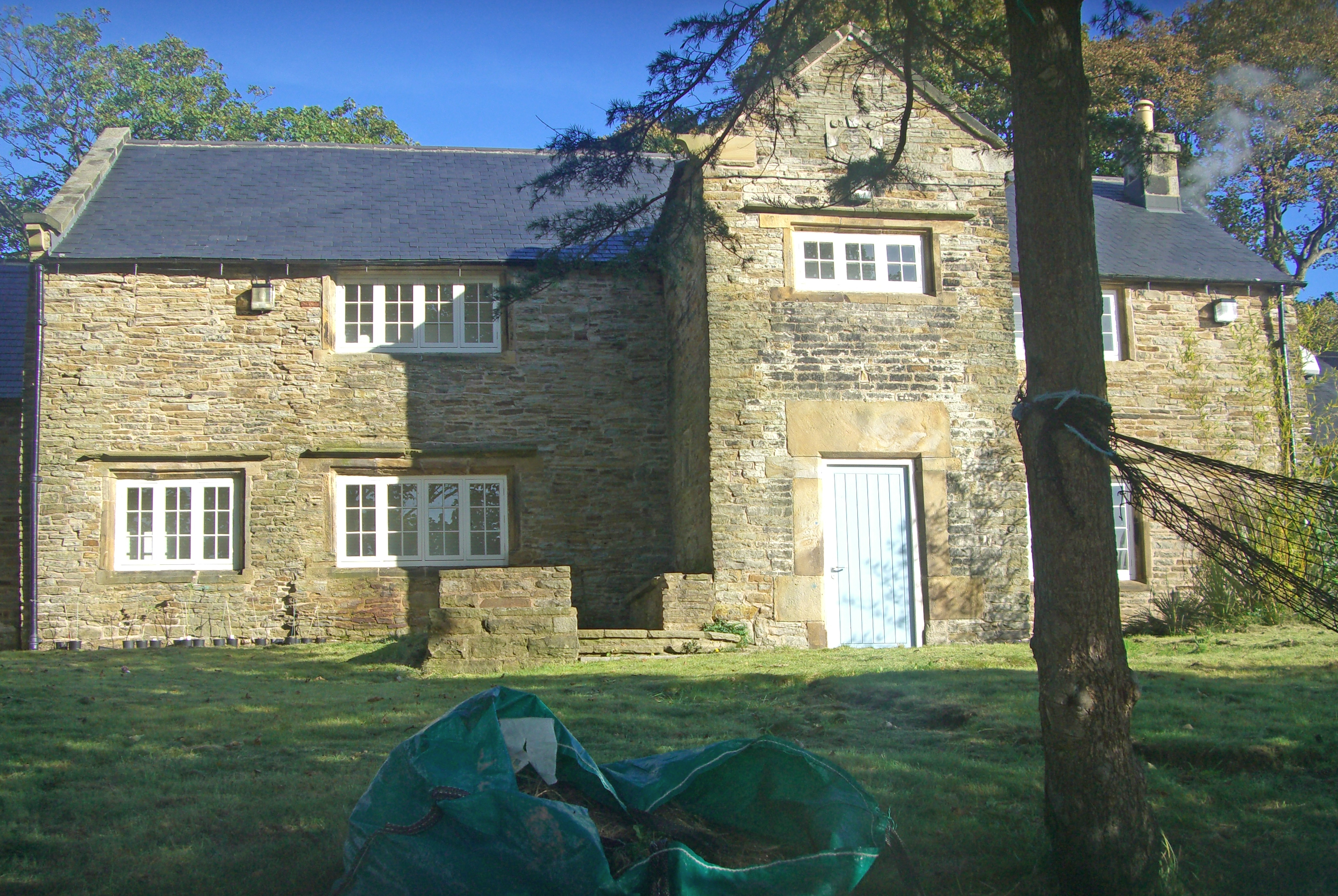
The Herdings

The Herdings is a grade-II listed building located in Herdings, Gleadless Valley, Sheffield, England. Although the current structure dates back to 1675, the original Herdings farm building was recorded as being present as early as the 13th century.

== History ==
The earliest mention of The Herdings comes from a grant from 1320 which mentions the name Thomas de Chaworth. On this deed we see two variations of the placename, first is Heytridding which appears to be the original name of the area, as well as Herdinge. The charter itself also mentions William and Robert de Heytridding. This grant shows that Thomas de Chaworth was giving land at Herdings to Alice, daughter of Agnetis Castelayn of Osberton and her daughter Rose.

There are also a number of descriptions and sketches of The Herdings from the 19th century, which depicts the building standing on a hill, covered with Ivy. A windmill also stood on the hill next to the farmstead however there appears to have been a lawsuit during the reign of Elizabeth I relating to the windmill and it was removed long before the turn of the 20th century.

== Local families ==
A number of families have been associated with The Herdings, In 1560 William Staniforth has a baptism record at the nearby St James, Norton church with his father being recorded as Henry Staniforth (Henrici Stannyforthe) husbandsman of Heardynges. This same Henry Staniforth has a burial record at the same church in 1575.

Following Henry's death it appears the farm was taken over by the Rollinson or Rawlinson family. Robert has a baptism at St. James dated 12 April 1582 and is described as being the son of Jerome Rawlinson of Herdings. The woodland area to the north of the farm was known as Rollinson Wood. In a deed written in 1622 Robert Rollinson leaves all land tithes, hay, wool etc. to John Bullocke of Darleighe (Darley Dale).

In 1653 Andrew Scriven, churchwarden was residing at The Herdings with his children Ann, William and Sarah. William would become well known in the village for his help with the poor, and upon his death he would leave money for children's education as well as clothing for the poor.

The Hazard family also resided at The Herdings for some time, Mr T.O. Hazard was born at the farm and lived there until his death.

The farm also went back into the possession of the Staniforth family during the 19th century, with Thomas Staniforth, born in 1805 living with his wife Ann (nee Hutchinson). He died in 1879.

== Modern day ==
The building was compulsorily purchased by the City Council in 1958 with the intention of destroying it to build the Herdings estate. It is now used as a heritage and community centre.

== See also ==
- Norton Lees
- Staniforth
- St James, Norton
