= Holy Cross Church, Gleadless Valley =

Church in Sheffield, South Yorkshire, England

Coordinates: 53.35150°N 1.44573°W

Holy Cross
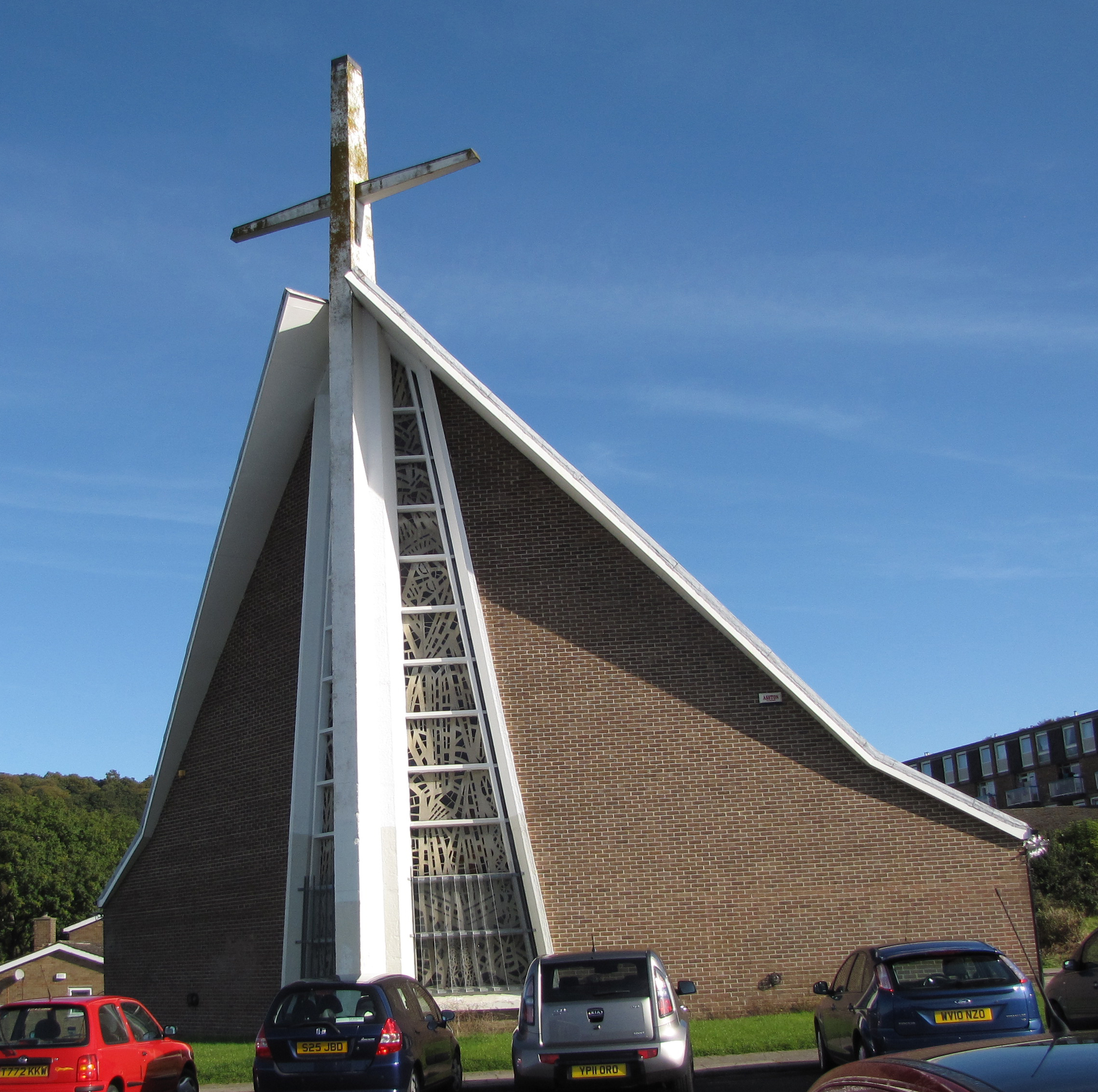
- Holy Cross Church, 2012
- Holy Cross
- Denomination: Church of England
- Churchmanship: Conservative Evangelical
- Website: www.achurchnearyou.com

History
- Dedication: Holy Cross

Architecture
- Completed: 1965

Administration
- Province: York
- Diocese: Sheffield
- Parish: Gleadless Valley

Clergy
- Vicar: The Revd David Middleton

Holy Cross Church, Gleadless Valley, is a Church of England church building in the City of Sheffield, England. It is situated on Spotswood Mount in Gleadless Valley and is a distinctive building constructed in 1964/65 and designed by the architects Braddock & Martin-Smith. It is positioned in a spectacular position among the houses on the Rollestone hillside. It has a canted front which is triangular in shape which has a large white cross at its apex. The interior features full height stained glass windows of the Virgin Mary and St John by John Baker.

The church appeared in the 2006 series This Is England written by Shane Meadows.
