= Gleadless Valley =

Housing estate in Sheffield, England

Coordinates: 53.34585°N 1.443329°W

- Location within South Yorkshire
- Population: 9,724 (S14 postcode. 2021)
- Metropolitan borough: Sheffield
- Metropolitan county: South Yorkshire
- Region: Yorkshire and the Humber
- Country: England
- Sovereign state: United Kingdom
- Post town: SHEFFIELD
- Postcode district: S2, S14
- Dialling code: 0114
- Police: South Yorkshire
- Fire: South Yorkshire
- Ambulance: Yorkshire
- UK Parliament: Sheffield Heeley

Gleadless Valley is a housing estate and electoral ward of the City of Sheffield in England. The population of the estate at the 2021 Census was 9,724. It lies 2.5 miles (4.0 km) south-southeast of the city centre. Formerly a rural area, Gleadless Valley was developed as a large housing project with around 4000 dwellings by Sheffield City Council between 1955 and 1962. It is an area of undulating land drained by the Meers Brook, which has its source on the high ground in the woodland at Gleadless. Adjacent are Gleadless to the east, Norton to the south-west, Heeley to the west and Arbourthorne to the north.

== History ==
Prior to the middle of the 19th century Gleadless valley was an area of isolated ancient woodland with some farmland. Buck Wood to the north of the valley is a modern name but in John Harrison’s survey of the manor of Sheffield in 1637 it was known as Berrystorth, an Old Norse name, which implies a wood of great antiquity. Much of the present day woodland has a wide range of ancient woodland indicator species including Bluebell, Dog's mercury, Common wood sorrel and Yellow archangel. Herdings Wood was the main area of trees in the valley in ancient times, this was later subdivided into Leeshall Wood, The Lumb and Rollestone Wood as well as Herdings Wood itself. It was first mentioned in a document dated 1642 which stated that William Chaworth, Lord and Knight of Norton had given permission for John Cotes and John Parker to fell and turn into charcoal a certain amount of trees in Herdyng Wood. Farming took place in the valley before the 17th century and wooded areas which were suitable for agricultural land were gradually felled leaving the woodland on the steep valley sides of the Meers Brook and its tributaries.

The expansion of Sheffied in the second half of the 19th century took in the nearby areas of Heeley and Meersbrook and this had an indirect effect on the Gleadless Valley as it started to be used for walks and recreation by the residents of these areas. By the 20th century, allotments and sports grounds had been laid out in the valley and Lees Hall golf club was established in 1907. Nearby Arbourthorne housing estate was built in the 1930s but even so the valley retained its rural charm and continued to be farmed. Local historian J. Edward Vickers called the valley at this time, “A beautiful stretch of open countryside and woodland, extending from Heeley to Norton”. The valley continued to be farmed into the 1950s exhibiting a landscape of scattered farms, woodland and hedge lined fields.

=== Housing development ===
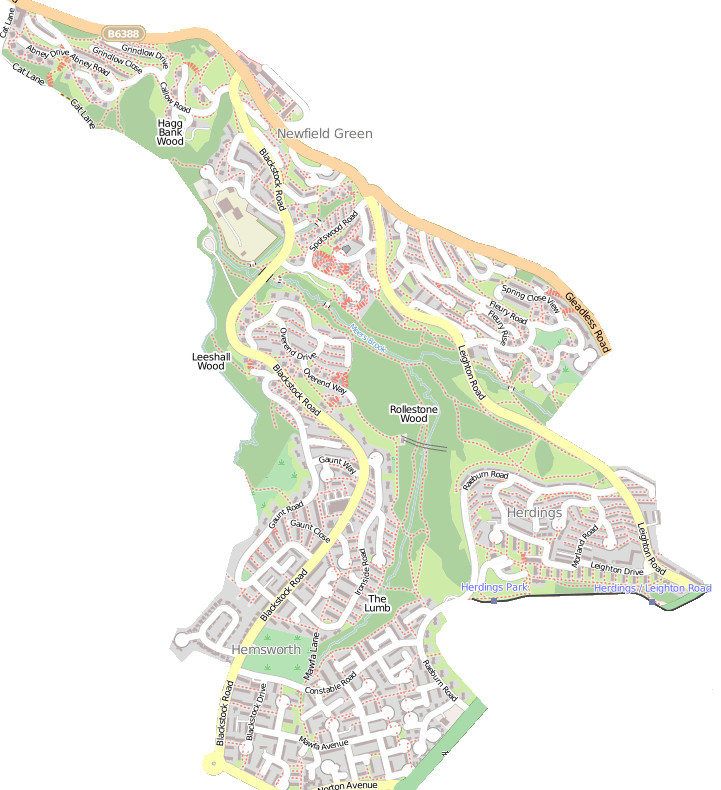

In 1955 work began on the Gleadless Valley housing estate and would continue until 1962. Farmland was bought up by Sheffield City Council by compulsory purchase order and the three districts of the new Gleadless Valley estate were named after the former farms of Herdings, Hemsworth and Rollestone. The project was planned to accommodate 17000 residents and was overseen by the city architect J.L. Womersley. The housing is diverse and includes tower blocks, maisonettes of various designs, three storey patio houses and more conventional houses with flat roofs as well as apartments for the elderly. One of the main challenges for Womersley when designing the scheme was the rolling terrain of the area, with slopes averaging 1 in 8 and reaching 1 in 4 in places. He overcame this by using patio houses, chalet-type housing and blocks of cluster houses which could be varied in design to suit the slope. The way that the housing was built impressively on the contours of the land and the retention of the ancient woodland is the reason that the Gleadless Valley project is held in such high esteem.

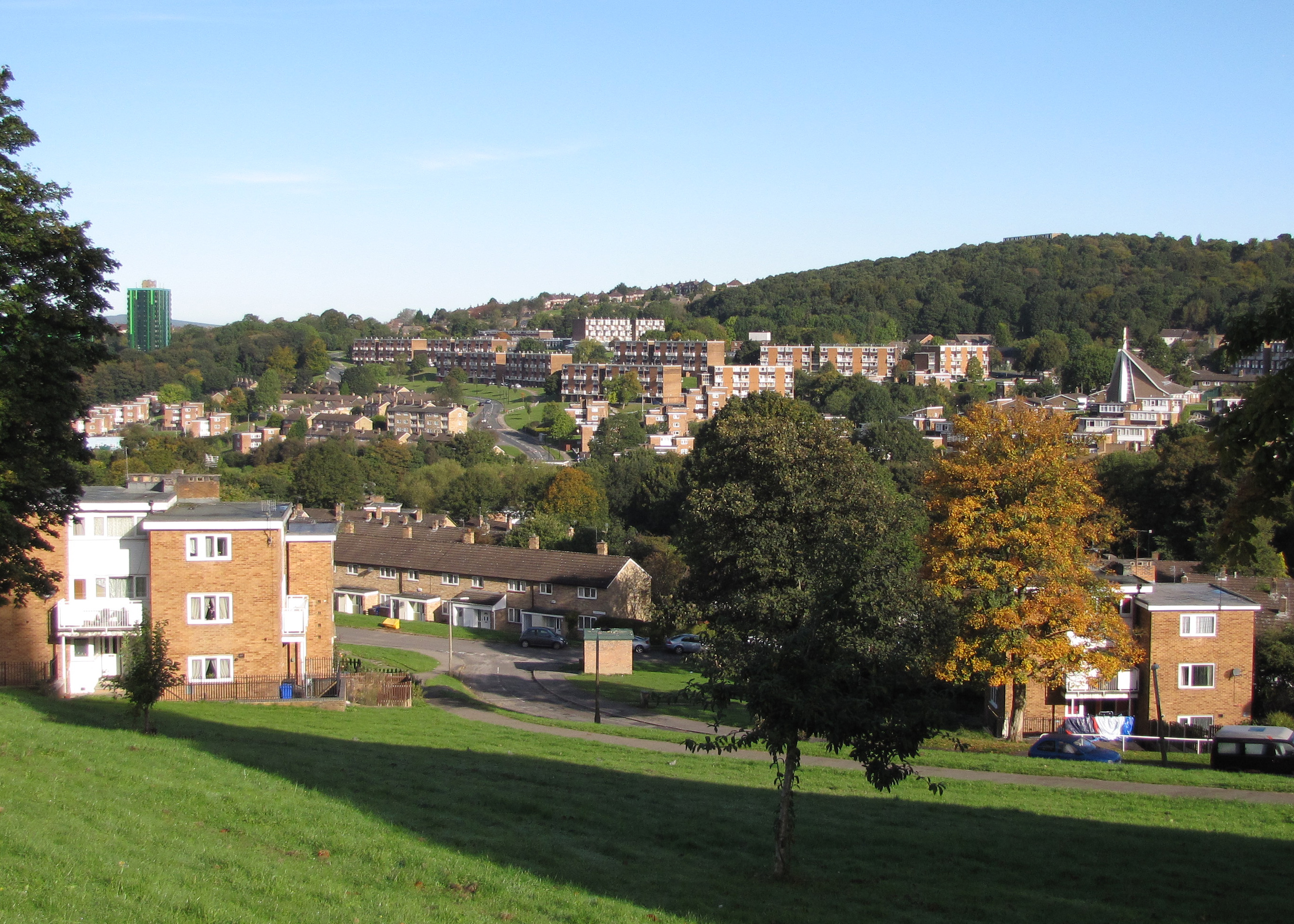
Looking north across Gleadless Valley, the diverse types of housing within the scheme can be seen.

Two tower block schemes are incorporated into the project, three blocks were built at Herdings at Raeburn Place in 1959. These blocks are built at an altitude of over 660 feet (200 m) and are a significant landmark on the Sheffield skyline. They were the first tower blocks to be built in Sheffield and were constructed by a London firm because no Sheffield contractor felt confident to take on the project. One of the blocks was demolished in the mid 1990s after it was found that it had been built on a fault and was unsafe. The two remaining blocks were refurbished and re-clad in 1998. Six more tower blocks were built at Callow Mount, Drive and Place in 1962 at the northern end of Gleadless Valley close to Newfield Green and these too were re-clad and modernised in the late 1990s.

== Amenities ==
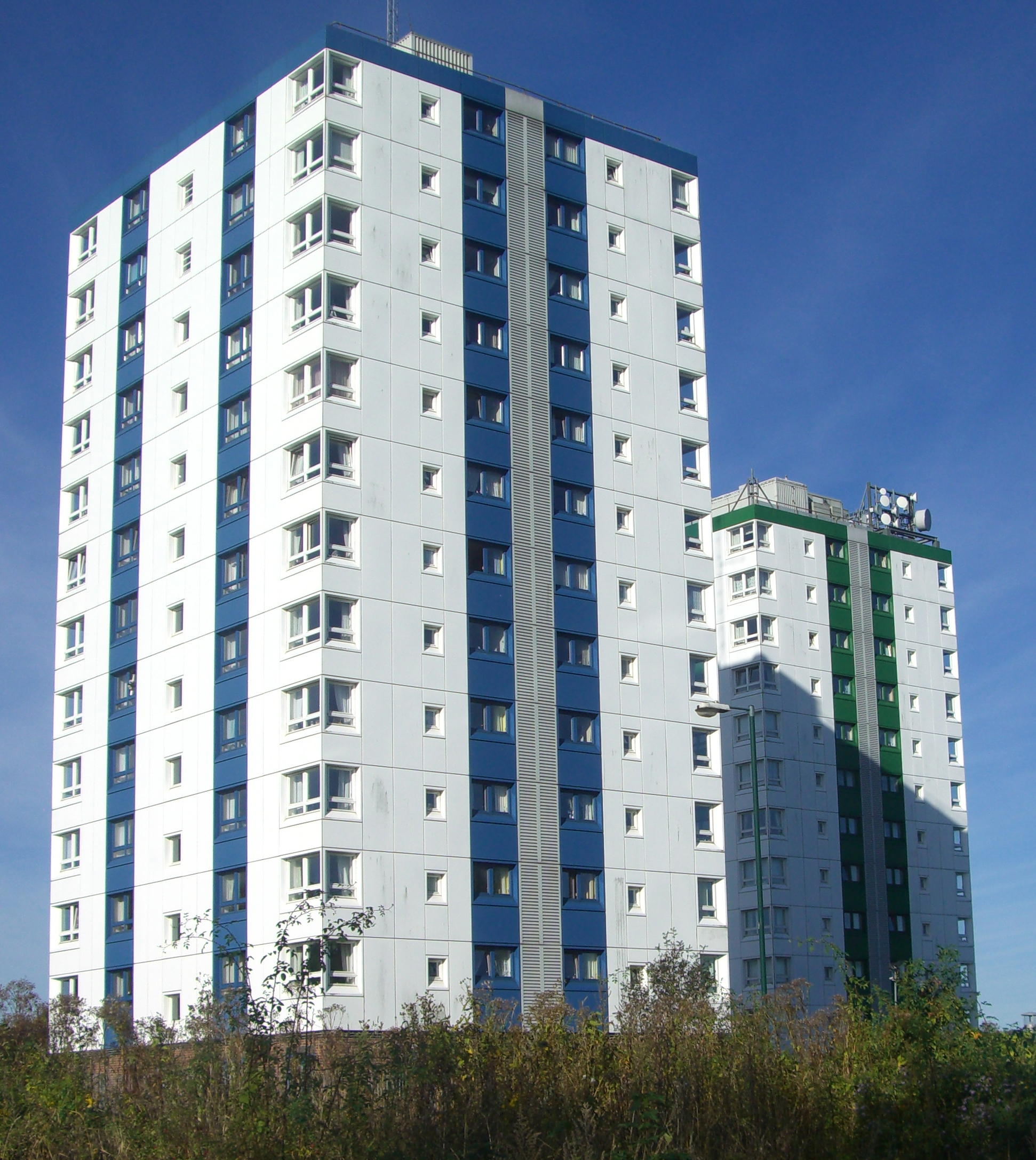
The two tower blocks at Herdings.

Gleadless Valley is served by two GP surgeries, Gleadless Medical Centre covers the northern part of the suburb at 636 Gleadless Road while the Sloan Medical Centre at 29 Blackstock Road serves the southern area. Primary schools in the area are Bankwood Community Primary School on Bankwood Close which has around 380 pupils and serves the northern part of the suburb and Valley Park Community School on Norton Avenue with around 390 pupils which serves the southern area. There are no secondary schools on the estate, the nearest two being Sheffield Springs Academy on Hurlfield Road and Newfield Secondary School on Lees Hall Road, both schools have around 1100 pupils. Gleadless Valley Comprehensive, which was fed from Bankwood, Hemsworth and Herdings Primary Schools respectively and was sited on Matthews Lane in Norton was demolished in 1994. Gleadless Valley has three small shopping centres to serve the three districts within the suburb. The Herdings district has a small area of shops on Morland Road near the tower blocks. The Hemsworth area has a group of shops midway along Blackstock Road known as the Gaunt shops while the Rollestone district has a retail area at Newfield Green.

The only public recreation area in the suburb is Herdings Park which has two football pitches, a bowling green and a children's playground, as well as open parkland. The Blackstock Road Household Waste Recycling Centre is located within Gleadless Valley, it is run by Veolia Environmental Services on behalf of Sheffield City Council.

The purple route of the Sheffield Supertram system terminates at Herdings Park giving good transport links for the southern part of the suburb while the First bus number 1a has a frequent service starting at Herdings (with 20 starting at, and 18 and 18a serving, Hemsworth) and serving the rest of the Gleadless Valley and Stagecoach bus 1 from Jordanthorpe on their way to Sheffield city centre 25 minutes away.

== Buildings of interest ==
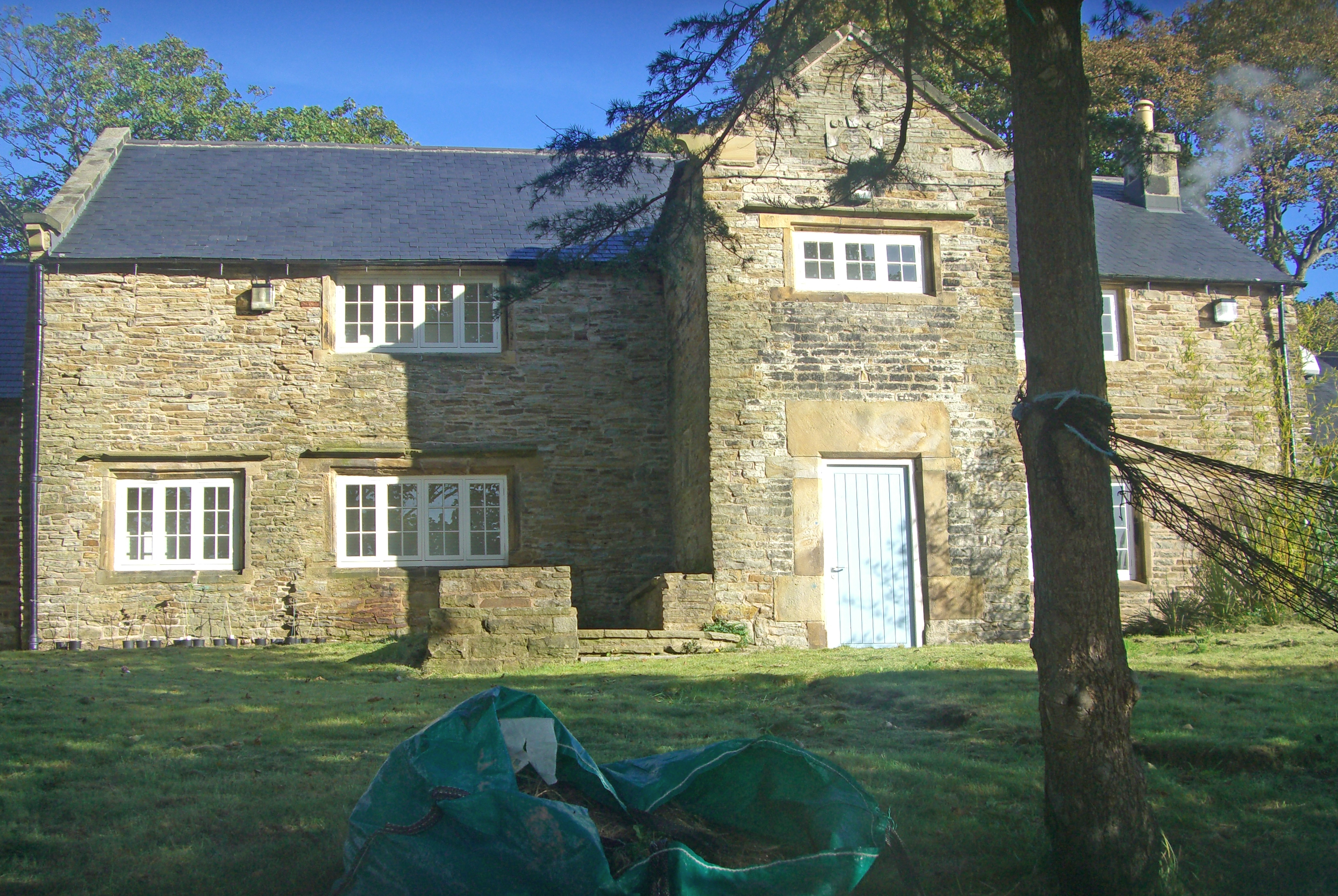
The Herdings, one of the oldest buildings in Sheffield.

=== The Herdings ===
There are two listed buildings within the estate, both of them Grade II and standing in the southern part of the suburb. The Herdings is an old farmhouse which stands on Morland Road. Much of the building dates from 1675 and that is the date on the lintel, it was built around the remaining three trusses of an earlier and larger cruck building. The oldest part of the building stands on Saxon foundations and dates from the 13th century, there are claims that it is the second oldest building in Sheffield after Bishops' House. During the reign of Elizabeth I a windmill stood close by. When the Gleadless Valley estate was built in the 1950s, The Herdings was converted into a Youth Club. The building suffered a fire a number of years ago and stood derelict for some time with no roof on. It was eventually fully restored and opened as a community venue in November 2010 known as the One 4 All Community Hub.

=== Bagshawe Arms ===
The other listed building is the Bagshawe Arms on Norton Avenue, this was built by the Bagshawe family of Oakes Park in Norton. It was originally a farmhouse, some of the farm buildings can still be seen at the rear, it was enlarged and renovated in 1829. The stable at the back of the pub has a flight of stairs going up the outside, this goes to an upper long room that was formerly the petty sessions court.

Holy Cross Church, Gleadless Valley is a church on Spotswood Mount. The other place of worship in the suburb is the Gleadless Valley Methodist Church on Blackstock Road, near the Gaunt shops, dating from 1960 and designed by J. Mansell Jenkinson & Son, it features a separated tower made up of four brick piers with a cross on top.

== See also ==
- List of council estates in the United Kingdom
