= Irene Mary Browne =

British artist (1881–1977)

- Born: 14 September 1881; Fulham, London
- Died: 27 June 1977 (aged 95); Sussex, England
- Education: Croydon School of Art; Westminster Technical Institute; Chelsea Polytechnic; Putney School of Art
- Known for: Sculpture, pottery

Irene Mary F.C. Browne (14 September 1881 – 27 June 1977) was a British artist known for her sculptures and pottery.

== Biography ==
Browne was born in Fulham in London in September 1881. She attended the Croydon School of Art and the Westminster Technical Institute before studying model making at Chelsea Polytechnic from 1906 to 1911. During her time at Chelsea, Browne won several prizes for her drawing and figure work and had, in 1908, her first work exhibited at the Royal Academy in London. Browne produced figures, medallions and statuettes in bronze and plaster and, after taking a pottery course at the Putney School of Art in 1919, began producing earthenware figures. These she had fired at the Fulham Pottery until she eventually bought her own kiln.

Browne continued to exhibit at the Royal Academy and elsewhere, notably in Manchester and Glasgow with the Royal Hibernian Academy and the Royal Glasgow Institute of the Fine Arts. She was elected a member of the Royal Society of Miniature Painters, Sculptors and Gravers in 1929 and a member of the Society of Women Artists in 1930. Browne lived at Richmond in Surrey and later in East Sussex where she died in 1977. The Victoria and Albert Museum in London, Manchester Art Gallery and Aberystwyth University hold examples of her work.
