= William Lancaster (politician) =

English businessman, philanthropist and politician (1841–1929)

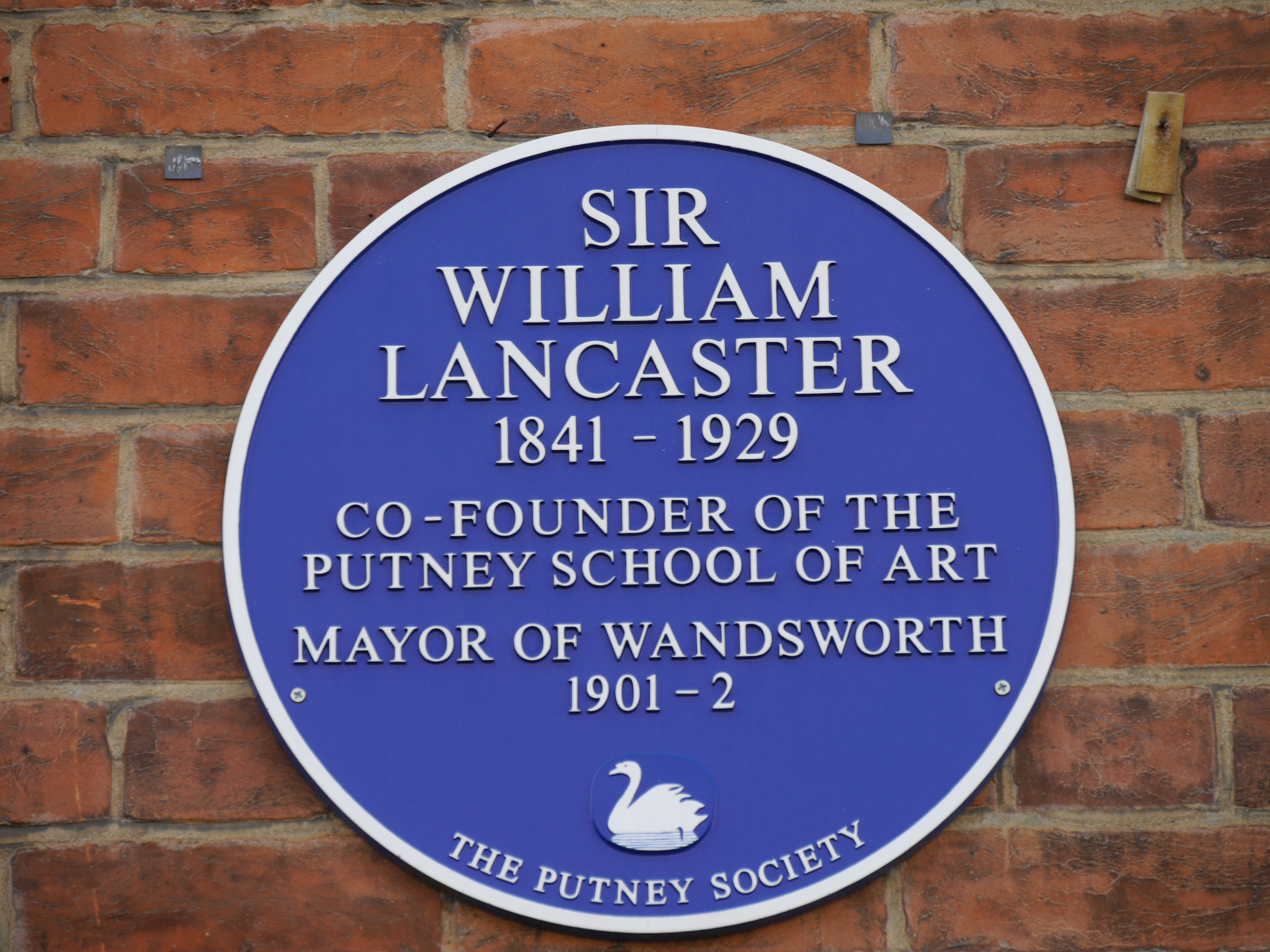
Blue plaque at Putney School of Art and Design

Sir William Lancaster (1841–1929) was an English businessman, philanthropist and politician, the second Mayor of Wandsworth (1901–02) and the co-founder of Putney School of Art and Design.

== Life and career ==
Lancaster was the son of John Lancaster, of West Winch, Norfolk. He was educated at King's Lynn Grammar School and joined the staff of the Prudential Assurance Company in 1868, when he was 17. He rose through the ranks of the expanding company and at the age of 33 he was appointed as its chief executive, with the title of Secretary. He held the post from 1874 to 1900, when he was elected a director, becoming deputy chairman for seven years. In December 1920, he retired; his eldest son, John Roy Lancaster, a surveyor, succeeded him on the board.

Lancaster took a keen interest in education, and he presented an endowment and new buildings to his old school which, as King Edward VII Grammar School, was opened by the King in 1906. Lancaster was knighted in connexion with the official opening. He received the freedom of King's Lynn in 1913. He was mayor of Wandsworth in 1901–2, and unsuccessfully contested the North-West constituency of Norfolk as a Conservative in 1906. He purchased land and helped to found Putney Hospital. He was elected Master of the Musicians' Company in 1921, and was a prominent Freemason, becoming Grand Treasurer of United Grand Lodge of England. He was a magistrate for the County of London, and Lord of the manor and ecclesiastical patron of East Winch.

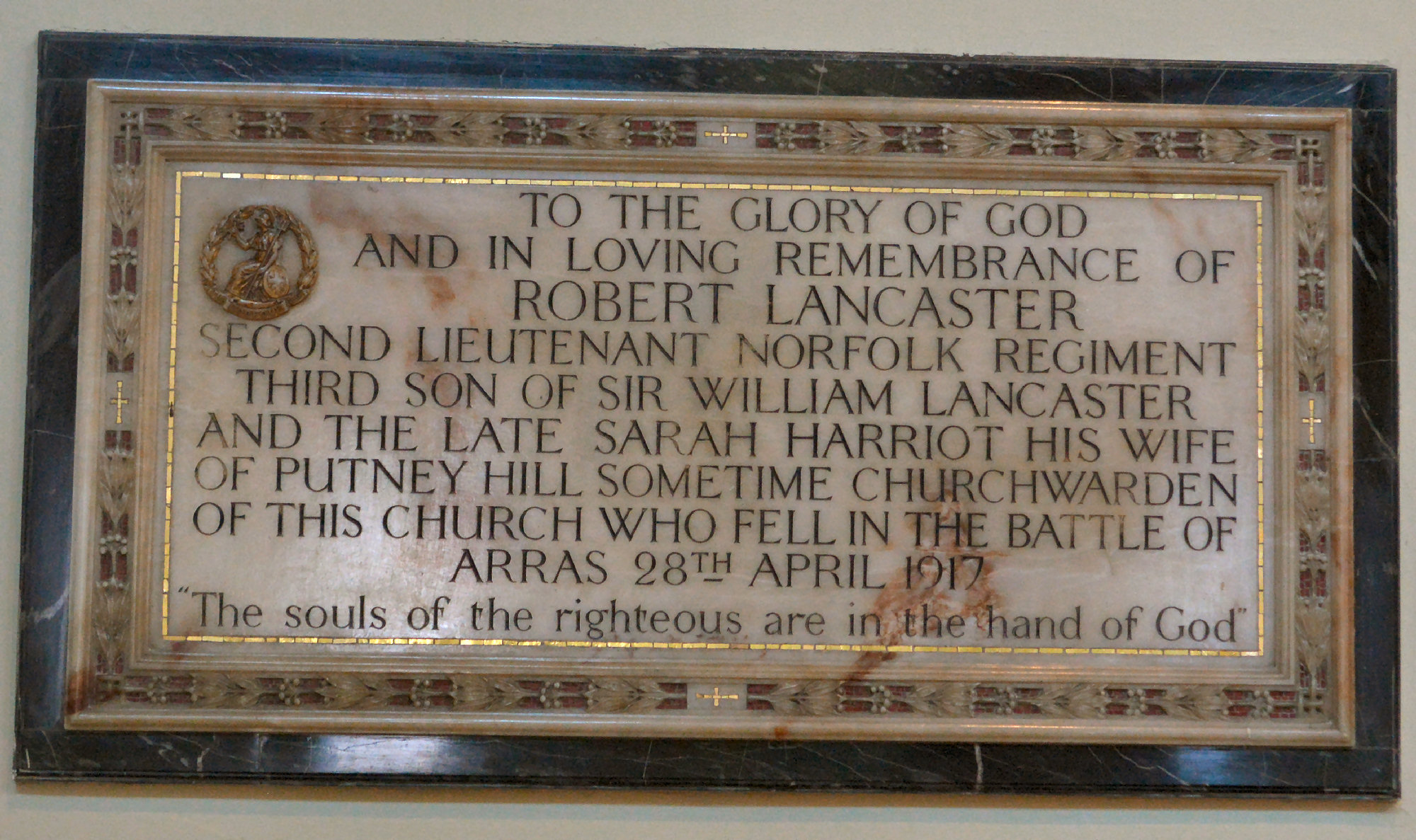
Memorial to Robert Lancaster, St John's Church

In 1868 Lancaster married Sarah Harriot, daughter of Dr D. T. Roy; she died in 1889. One son of the marriage was killed in action in the First World War, and three sons and two daughters survived their parents. One of his grandchildren was the cartoonist and architectural historian Osbert Lancaster.

== Sources ==
- Boston, Richard (1989). Osbert: A Portrait of Osbert Lancaster. London: Collins. ISBN 978-0-00-216324-8.
