= Cecil Keeling =

English designer and illustrator

Cecil Keeling (1912-1976) was an English designer and illustrator. He produced a varied range of work, including scraperboard, lithography and linocuts as well as a number of wood engravings.

Keeling was born in Teddington, Middlesex. He first attended Putney School of Art (1930–34). Then, whilst working for a printing company, he spent a year at Chelsea School of Art.

In 1947 his book Pictures of Persia was published by Robert Hale Ltd. Printed by Cowell's of Ipswich, the book contained memoirs from his wartime service there alongside 30 colour plates.
