= Hilary Stebbing =

British artist (1915–1996)

- Born: 1915
- Died: 1996 (aged 80–81); Winchelsea
- Education: Central School of Art and Design
- Spouse: John ‘Jack’ Baker

Hilary Stebbing (1915–1996) was a British artist, illustrator and children's author, particularly associated with Puffin Books, and active in the United Kingdom from the 1940s to the 1960s.

== Biography ==
She was a student at the Central School of Arts and Crafts in the late 1930s, where she was a contemporary of Monica Walker and the stained-glass artist, conservator and author John ‘Jack’ Baker, whom she married in 1946.

Her woodblock print 'Heaven, Hell and Purgatory' was included in the annual Exhibition of the Society of Wood Engravers in 1939. It was shown again in the Society's Centenary Exhibition at the Ashmolean Museum in Oxford in 2020 and illustrated in the catalogue. It is also reproduced in Simon Lawrence’s history of the Society, Spitsticks and Multiples (Fleece Press 2022).

She exhibited at Court Lodge Gallery, Horton Kirby, Dartford, Derbyshire County Council Museum Service and Rye Society of Artists.

== Works ==
- Pantomime Stories, Puffin, 1943
- Maggie the Streamlined Taxi, The Transatlantic Arts Company Limited, 1943
- The Silly Rabbits. A tale, (Picture Book no. 19), Bantam, 1944
- The Animals Went in Two by Two, (Picture Book no. 20), Bantam, 1944
- Monty's New House, The Transatlantic Arts Company Limited, 1944
- Extinct Animals, Puffin, 1946
- Freddy and Ernest, the Dragons of Wellbottom Poggs, Puffin, 1946
- Living Animals, Cassell & Co. Ltd, 1954
- The Ten Pussy-Cats, Listen with Mother, BBC Light Programme, 1962

== Legacy ==
The University of the Arts London (the successor to the Central School of Arts and Crafts) has six of Stebbing's works in its collection.

The two Bantam books, The Silly Rabbits and The Animals Went in Two by Two, were republished in a limited edition by Design for Today.

Two limited edition giclee prints were produced in 2022 to support development of the new House of Illustration at New River Head in Islington, London.

In October 2022, Stebbing was included alongside Kathleen Hale, Eric Ravilious, Edward Ardizzone, Pablo Picasso, and Henri Matisse in the exhibition 'Picture Books For All: the fine printing of W. S. Cowell Ltd.' at The Hold heritage centre in Ipswich.
