= Margaret Traherne =

British artist (1919–2006)

- Born: Hazel Wilkes; 23 November 1919; Westcliff-on-Sea, England
- Died: 30 June 2006 (aged 86); Brighton, England
- Known for: Stained glass windows

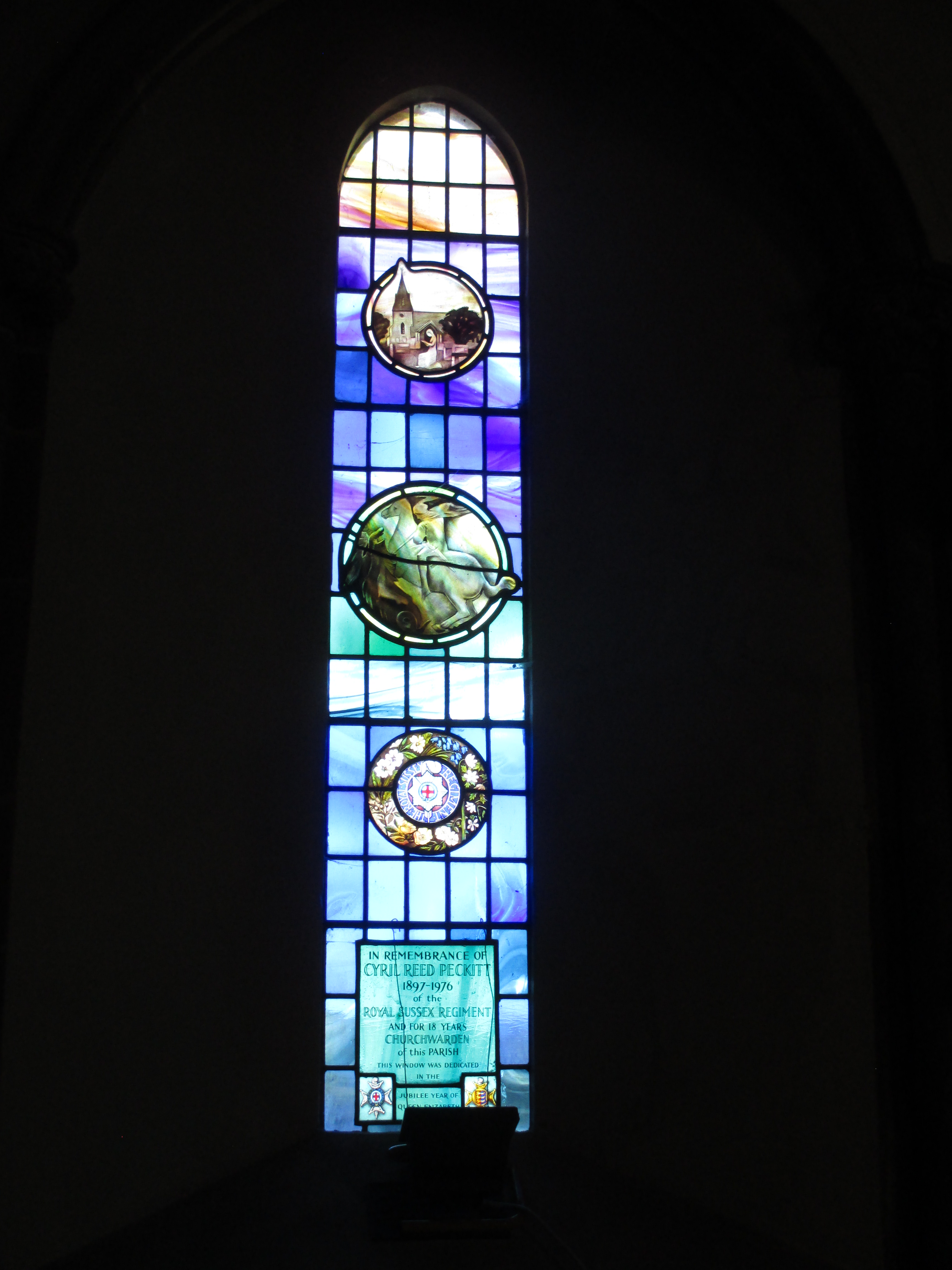
A stained glass window designed by Traherne in 1978 for Chailey Church. It is located in the North Chancel.

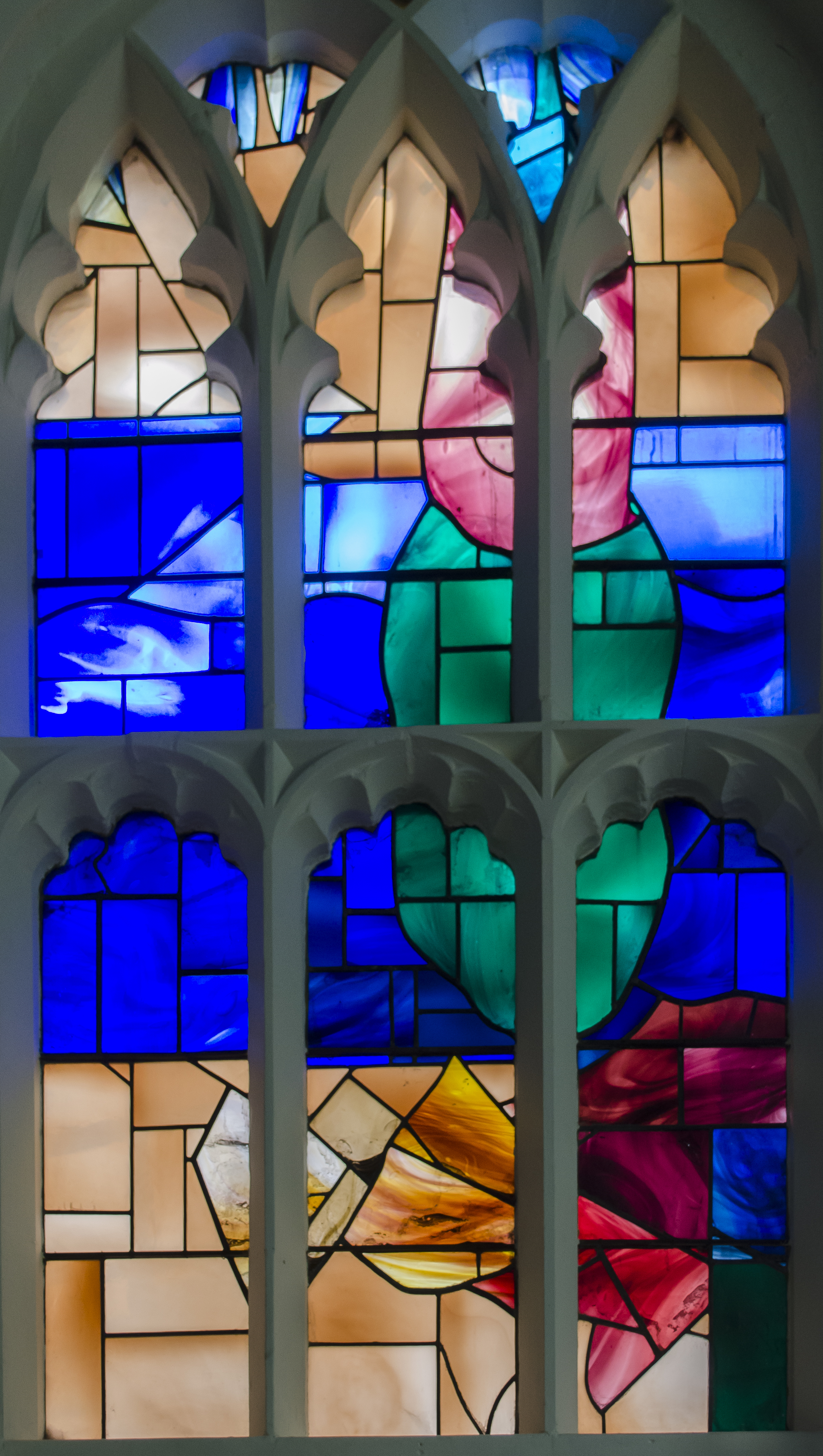
Stained glass window design by Margaret Traherne.

Margaret Traherne (23 November 1919 — 30 June 2006) was an Essex-born artist active in the twentieth century. She was regarded as a leading artist of her generation. Noted for her stained glass designs, she also worked in sculpture as well as embroidered textiles and mixed media, examples of which are held in the Victoria and Albert Museum.

== Early life ==
Born in Westcliff-on-Sea, Essex, Traherne moved with her family to Long Island, New York in 1925, aged six. She later attended Southend High School after returning from eight years spent in New York.

== Education ==
Traherne attended Croydon School of Art from 1936, where she studied under Ruskin Spear. It was here that she met her future husband, David Thomas, and the pair married in 1943. Traherne joined the Kingston School of Art during the Second World War, before joining the Design School at the Royal College of Art in 1945. In 1953-54 she spent a year of experimentation at the Central School of Arts and Crafts in the stained glass department run John Baker and Tom Fairs.

== Stained glass windows ==
Margaret Traherne's designs for stained glass appear across England, including the examples below,

- Fire Window, Manchester Cathedral (1966). The window was reconstructed using glass from Germany after it was destroyed by an IRA bomb in 1996.
- Chapel of Reconciliation and The Lady Chapel, Liverpool Cathedral
- Bapistry windows, St Peter's Church, Nottingham (1976)
- Chapel of Unity, Coventry Cathedral
- North chancel window, St Peter's Church, Chailey, East Sussex (1978)
- St Cuthberts, Rye Park. Traherne wrote of this design, "I found St. Cuthbert a sympathetic character and one that people today will relate to. I hope that my feeling will come through the design."
- Michelham Priory of Upper Dicker, Hailsham in Sussex features Traherne's earliest known glass design, a depiction of the Virgin and Child (1956).
- St Kenelm window, St Peter's, Wootton Wawen (1958)
- St Margaret Mary Church, Park Gate, Hampshire (1966)

== Works in public collections ==
A range of works by Margaret Traherne are held in public British collections, including the following,

Title	Year	Medium	Gallery no.	Gallery	Location
Cope	1950s	wool with appliquéd embroidery, padded, silk thread	CIRC.302-1961	Victoria and Albert Museum	London
Fret	1956	jacquard-woven fabric	CIRC.680-1956	Victoria and Albert Museum	London
Fret	1956	jacquard-woven fabric	CIRC.680A-1956	Victoria and Albert Museum	London
Fret	1956	jacquard-woven fabric	CIRC.680B-1956	Victoria and Albert Museum	London
Light Box	1974	glass & acrylic plastic	AH01527/75	Abbot Hall Art Gallery	Cumbria, England
Light Box	1974	glass & acrylic plastic	AH01528/75	Abbot Hall Art Gallery	Cumbria, England
Light Box	-	glass & perspex	L.F461.1976.0.0	New Walk Museum & Art Gallery	Leicestershire, England
Poppy head on a blue ground	1980	watercolour	P.15-1981	Victoria and Albert Museum	London
Standing Stones	c.1959	moulded concrete	008	Loughborough University	Leicestershire, England
Yellow Nude Collage	1974	gouache & cut paper collage	P.16-1981	Victoria and Albert Museum	London
