= Igor Tulipanov =

Russian-American painter

Igor Tulipanov (born 1939) is a Russian-American painter born in St. Petersburg, Russia.

== Early life ==
Igor Tulipanov began painting in his early childhood. He was a student in the painting workshop of M. Gorohova . He studied for a year at the Admiral Makarov State Maritime Academy in St. Petersburg. Later he was enrolled for four years at the Polytechnic Institute in St. Petersburg. Igor then studied at the Repin State Academic Institute of Painting Sculpture and Architecture in St. Petersburg. He did not complete his studies at these institutions.

In 1959, Igor Tulipanov became a student of Nikolai Akimov, an artist, critic, director and teacher. Tulipanov received artistic training under his guidance. In 1964, Tulipanov graduated from the Ostrovsky St Petersburg State Theater Arts Academy. After graduating, he began a career in production design. He worked at theaters in Moscow and St. Petersburg until 1968. Igor's early exhibitions often provoked scandals, early dismissals and scathing publications in the Soviet mass media.

== Career ==
In May 1979, Tulipanov emigrated to the United States.

== Exhibitions ==
- 1962 – Hostel of Polytechnical Institute, Russia
- 1963 – Cafe Rovestnik, Russia
- 1964 – Pylcovo Observatory, Russia
- 1975 – Nevsky Palace of Culture, group exhibition, St. Petersburg, Russia
- 1994 – Alex Edmund Gallery, New York, NYC
- 1995–1996 – United Nations, Geneva, Switzerland
- 1997 – Consulate General of the Russian Federation, New York, NY
- 1998 – United Nations, New York, NY
- 2001 – Artist on the Lawn, White House, Washington, D.C.
- 2003–2004 – St. Petersburg 300th Anniversary, Chelsea Art Museum, New York, NY

== Personal life ==
In 1977, Igor married Elena Tulipanov, who is also a painter. Elena frequently assists with the meticulous detailing in the patterns and designs in Igor's acrylic paintings. When Elena contributes to the creation of a painting, Igor includes an "E" next to his trademark signature of an "IT" monogram to acknowledge her contribution.
