= Buttermarket Centre, Ipswich =

Shopping centre in Ipswich, England

Coordinates: 52.0565°N 1.1540°E

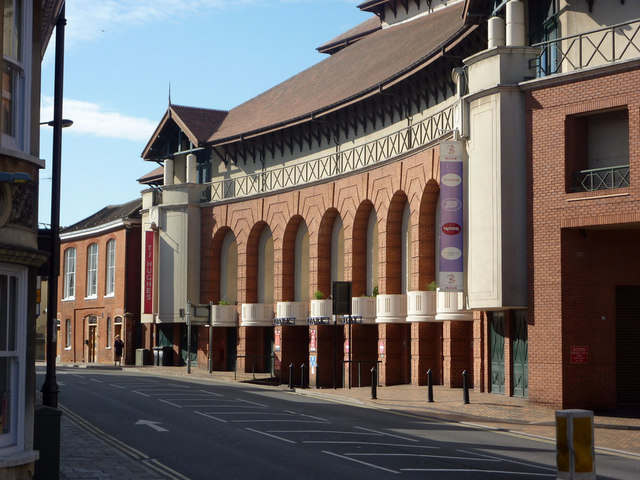
The rear of The Buttermarket showing the car park entrance

The Buttermarket Centre is a four-level shopping centre located in the centre of Ipswich, Suffolk, England. The centre was opened on 1 October 1992, comprising 270,000 square feet (25,000 m^{2}). There is a 430-space underground car park covering two levels under the shopping centre. There is also access from the car park to the shopping centre via lifts and stairs. The anchor stores (upon opening) were Owen Owen and C&A, however TK Maxx is now the anchor store comprising 120,000 square feet (11,000 m^{2}) of floor space. The shopping centre has 32 retail units including New Look, Holland & Barrett and Krispy Kreme.

The shopping centre has embedded itself into the local community via initiatives such as ‘Buttermarket Beneficiaries’, with the centre supporting local charities and groups. This initiative involves offering free vacant units and mall spaces for charitable activities and hosting a community board so local groups and community projects can raise awareness. In 2025 the centre security installed a "Chatty Bench" after noticing people sitting alone, to help tackle social isolation, and a local artist, Keith Hopewell, created a mural of Ed Sheeran who grew up in the county. The Buttermarket Centre achieved a 1.3% year-on-year increase in footfall during 2025.

In 2012 the national cinema chain, Vue Cinemas, was granted permission by Ipswich Borough Council to convert the 2 storey shopping centre into a cinema. Their vision for the conversion was to convert the ground floor into a 9 screen cinema with retail outlets on the upper floor. However, in February 2015, Vue Cinemas withdrew the plans but did not give a reason why.

== Ownership ==
In March 2015 the centre was bought by Capital & Regional and Drum Property Group for £9.2 million. The group venture, called Buttermarket Ipswich Ltd, saw the creation of a new Empire Cinemas 12 screen complex, and dining/leisure units, as part of a £35 million revamp, which opened on 31st March 2017. The centre was subsequently sold to National Grid Pension Fund, who purchased it for £54.7m in 2017, after it was revamped. By 2026, the shopping centre had been put on the market for £10 million.
