= Monica Walker (illustrator) =

British writer and illustrator

- Education: Central School of Arts and Crafts
- Occupations: Illustrator, writer

Monica Walker was a writer and illustrator, active in the United Kingdom in the 1940s and 1950s.

She was a student at the Central School of Arts and Crafts in the late 1930s. She is depicted as a shopkeeper in an illustration, High Street, by her fellow student Hilary Stebbing.

Walker worked for a time as a draughtswoman in an aircraft factory.

She illustrated children's books, including her own The Educated Pig (Oxford University Press; 1949) and texts by others such as Ditties for the Nursery (Oxford University Press, 1954) by Iona Opie, Trouble for Tembo (Dolphin Books/ University of London Press, 1958) by Lesley Bourne, and Martin's Holiday (Dolphin Books/ University of London Press, 1960) by Enid Wiseman.

Her work was featured on the cover of the 1956 Christmas edition of Radio Times.

A 1947 portrait photograph of Walker, by John Gay, is in the collection of the National Portrait Gallery. She was photographed by Gay for, and featured in, an article in The Strand Magazine, "Eight Young Artists in Search of an Editor", in which she was said to be living with her parents in Surbiton.

The University of the Arts London (the successor to the Central School of Arts and Crafts) has three of her works in its collection.
