= Putney School of Art and Design =

Art college in London, England

Coordinates: 51.461821°N 0.212251°W

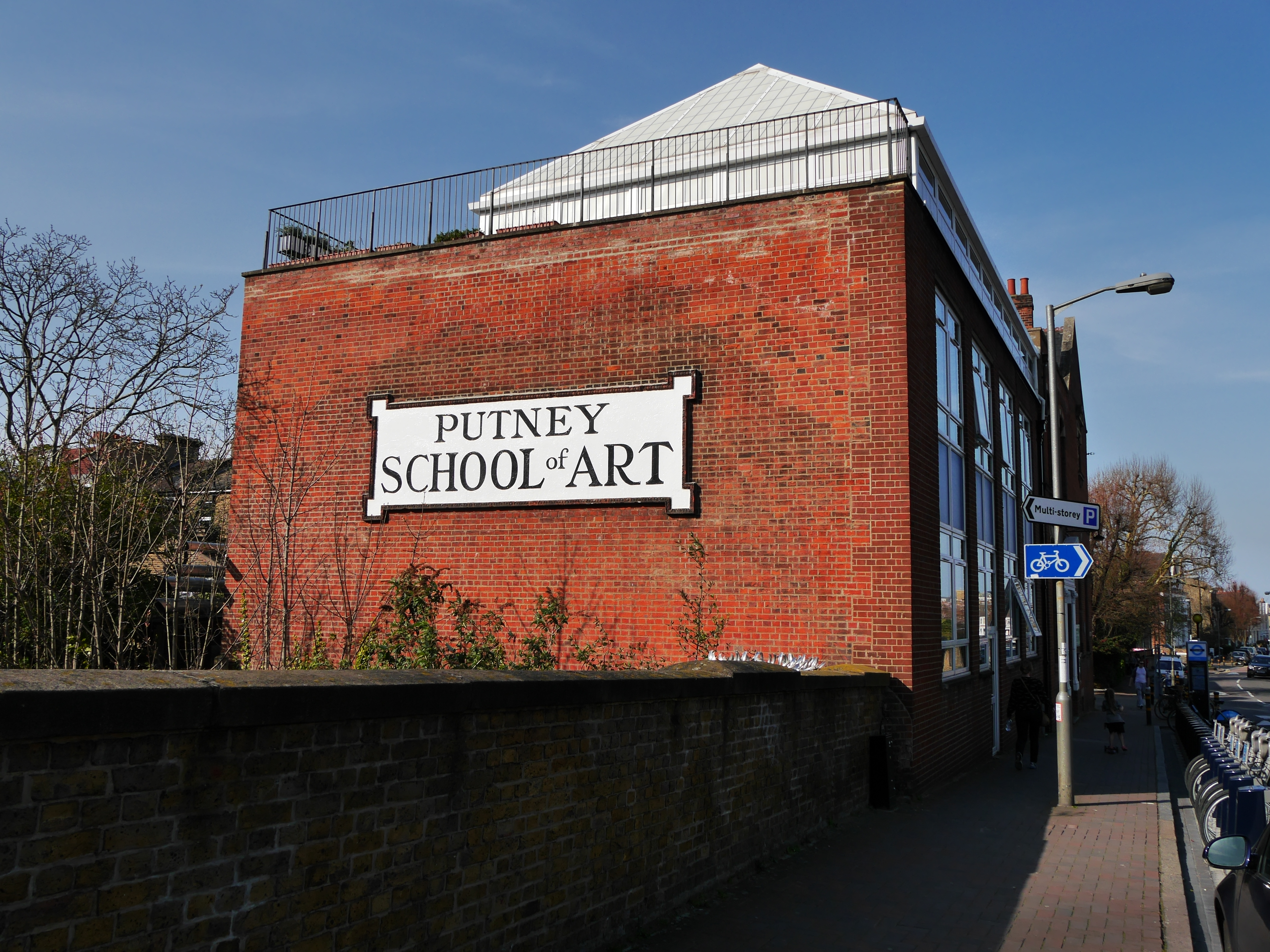
Putney School of Art and Design from the Oxford road railway bridge.

Putney School of Art and Design (PSAD) is an art college in Putney, in the London Borough of Wandsworth.

== Location ==
The school is on the corner of Oxford road and Disraeli road, and backs on to the railway between Putney and Wandsworth town.

== History ==
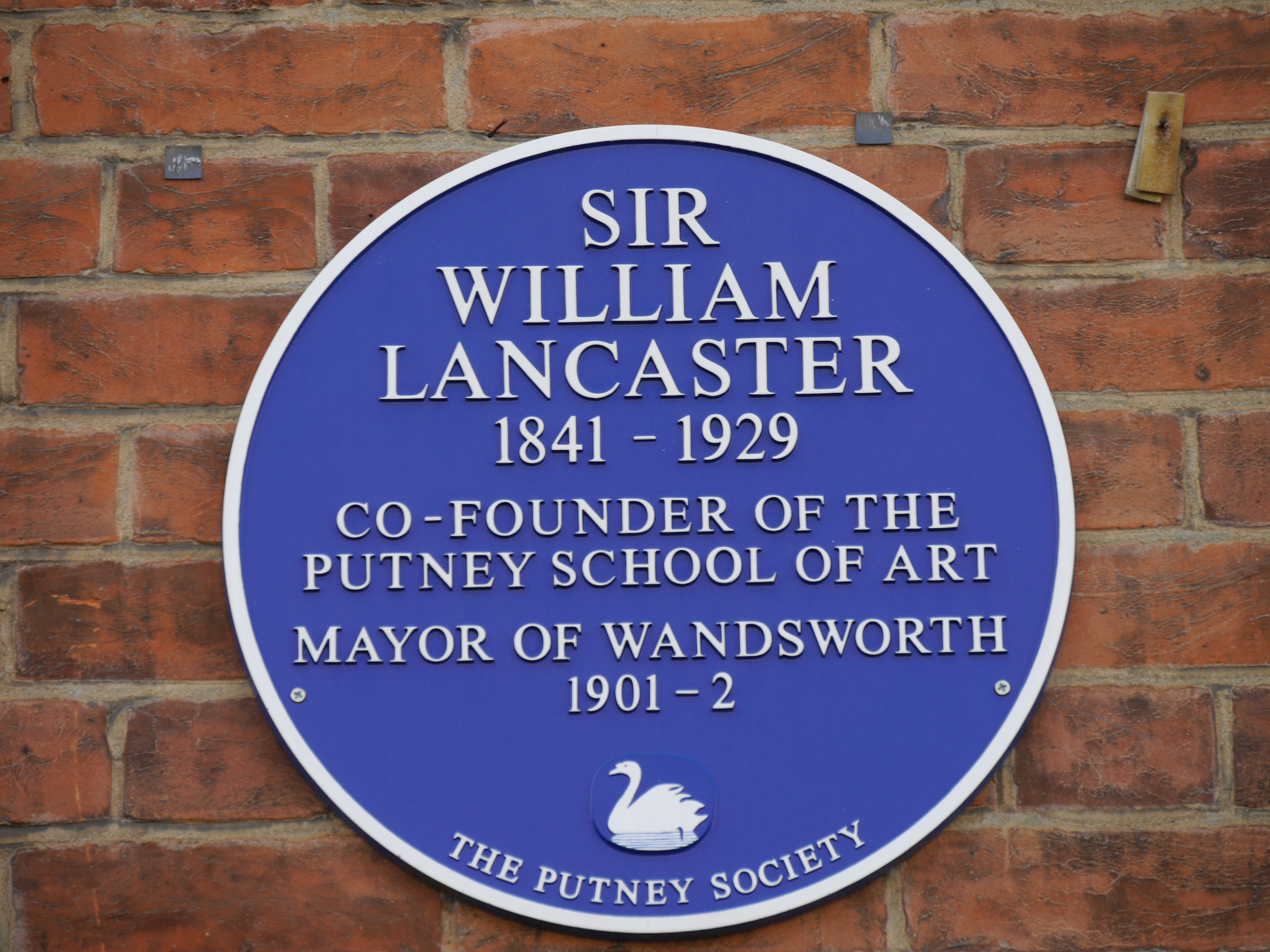
The Putney Society Blue Plaque for school co-founder Sir William Lancaster.

Local politician and philanthropist Sir William Lancaster, eminent Judge Baron Pollock, and British statesman Sir Arthur Jeff founded the school in 1883. For the first 11 years the school was based in parish offices on Putney High Street, until the building on Disraeli road, designed by John W. Wallis, opened on 2 October 1895. It has six studios, one on the first floor with large north-facing windows and a vaulted wooden ceiling.

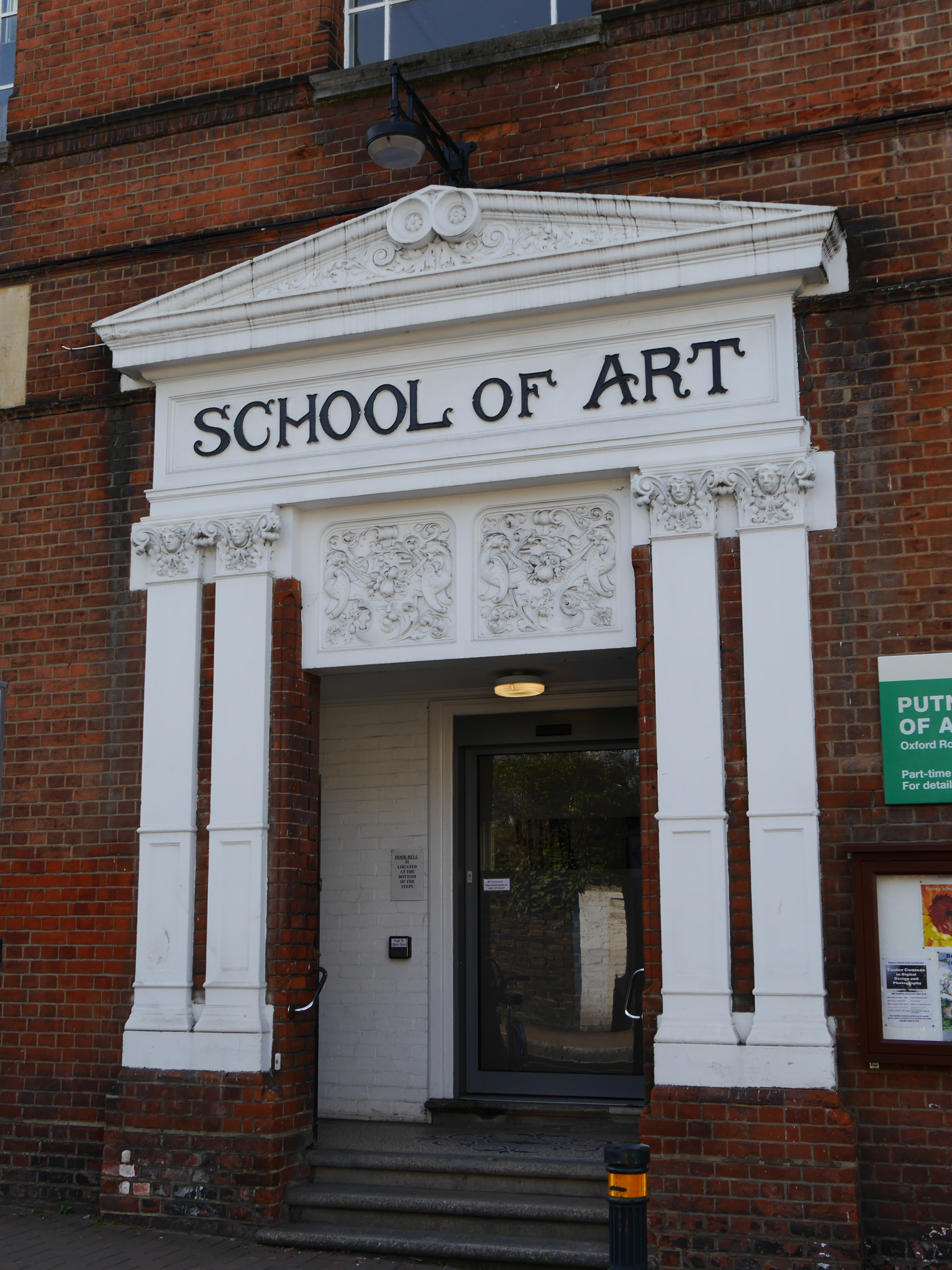
Entrance to the school on Oxford road.

In 1906 the school was taken over by London County Council, as of 2021 it is managed by Wandsworth Borough Council in partnership with Enable Leisure and Culture. A new studio and cafe were added in 2009.

The Friends of Putney School of Art and Design is a charity that supports the work of the school art in the local community.

== Courses ==
The school offers courses in digital design, drawing and painting, printmaking, sculpture and ceramics; for beginners, experienced students and in mixed ability sessions. There are also courses for young people and to develop a-level portfolios, as well as short courses and holiday courses. The art and design diploma course is delivered part time over two years, students can then progress onto undergraduate studies elsewhere.

Courses for residents in the Wandsworth Borough community are offered at a reduced cost.

== Notable staff ==
John William Allison (1866-1934), an early Headmaster of the school.

James (John) Bowyer (1872-1941), Principal of the school.

William Bernard Adeney (1878-1966), teacher at the school.

Charles Doman (1884–1944), teacher of sculpture at the school.

Frederick Austin (1902-1990), teacher at the school.

== Notable students ==
Ethel Walker (1861-1951), student at the school.

Irene Mary Browne (1881-1977), pottery student at the school, before starting her career in sculpture and pottery.

Roland Batchelor (1889-1990), student at the school, before serving in the first world war.

Lilian Holt (1898–1983), student at the school, before the first world war.

Clifford Hall (1904-1973), student at the school, moved on to the Royal Academy of Arts schools.

Cecil Keeling (1912-1976), student at the school, before moving on to Chelsea.

Unity Spencer (1930 - 2017), attended the school late in life before her death in 2017.

Jill Meager (living), worked as an actor before attending the school.

== Transport ==
The school is served by Transport for London buses 14, 39. 85, 93, 424, and 430 which stop at Putney Station on Putney High Street, and numbers 37 and 337 which stop at East Putney station on the Upper Richmond road. East Putney tube station (District line) is a 3-minute walk and Putney railway station (Southwestern Railway) is a 5-minute walk round the corner.

The Santander Cycles Putney rail station docking station is a 4-minute walk, there is also public cycle parking on Disraeli road.
