= Ivan Karp =

- Born: June 4, 1926; Bronx, New York, U.S.
- Died: June 28, 2012 (aged 86); Charlotteville, New York, U.S.
- Occupations: Art dealer, antiquarian
- Years active: 1958-2012
- Known for: OK Harris Gallery

Ivan C. Karp (June 4, 1926 – June 28, 2012) was an American art dealer, gallerist and author instrumental in the emergence of pop art and the development of Manhattan's SoHo gallery district in the 1960s.

Ivan Karp was born in the Bronx and grew up in Flatbush, Brooklyn. His career in art began in 1955, when he served as the first art critic of the Village Voice. In 1956, he joined the Hansa Gallery, a downtown artists' cooperative gallery that had moved uptown to Central Park South. Karp was co-director, alongside Richard Bellamy, who later founded the Green Gallery. He moved to the relatively new Leo Castelli Gallery in 1959 as associate director. While there, he helped sell the works of, popularize and market the initial generation of Pop artists, including Andy Warhol, Roy Lichtenstein and Robert Rauschenberg.

On April 25, 1966, in Newsweek Magazine, Ivan Karp is described as the "Sol Hurok of Pop Art". He said he was devoted to this art form because the artists "transform banal objects. They see beauty in all things".

Karp worked with Castelli for ten years, leaving in 1969 to open the OK Harris Gallery in SoHo, Manhattan. Karp's was the second art gallery to open on West Broadway, which ultimately became the core of the SoHo gallery district. His initial focus at O.K. Harris was on Photorealism, with artists such as Ralph Goings, Robert Cottingham and Robert Bechtle. Other artists represented by the gallery included Deborah Butterfield, Malcolm Morley and Duane Hanson.

In the early 1960s, Karp led efforts to salvage architectural ornament from older New York City buildings that were being demolished for new construction. He founded the Anonymous Arts Recovery Society and often drove around the streets of Manhattan and the Bronx spotting and collecting materials from building sites before they could be carted away as rubble. Many of the hundreds of items recovered by Karp and his colleagues were deposited in the collection of the Brooklyn Museum, displayed in the sculpture garden and the subway station adjacent to the museum. The Brooklyn Museum transferred 1500 architectural artifacts to the National Building Arts Center, located in Sauget, Illinois. Others are housed in the Anonymous Arts Museum Karp founded in Charlotteville, New York.

Karp wrote a 1965 comic novel, "Doobie Doo", about love among pop artists with cover art by Roy Lichtenstein and Andy Warhol.

He died on June 28, 2012, at the age of 86, in Charlotteville, New York.
