= Kassel Synagogue =

Former Reform synagogue in Kassel, Germany

- German: Kassel Synagoge
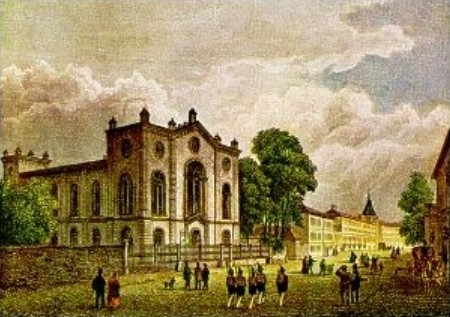
- The former synagoge in 1839

- Location of the former synagogue in Hesse

Religion
- Affiliation: Judaism (former)
- Ecclesiastical or organizational status: Synagogue (1839–1938)
- Status: Destroyed

Location
- Location: Untere Königsstraße, Kassel, Hesse
- Country: Germany
- Interactive map of Kassel Synagogue
- Coordinates: 51°19′11″N 9°30′10″E

Architecture
- Architect: Albrecht Rosengarten
- Type: Synagogue architecture
- Style: Rundbogenstil
- Completed: 1839
- Destroyed: November 1938 (during Kristallnacht

The Kassel Synagogue (German: Kassel Synagoge) was a former Jewish congregation and synagogue, located on Untere Königsstraße, in Kassel, Hesse, Germany. The second synagogue for the congregation was completed in 1839 and set ablaze by the Nazis on November 9, 1938, during the Kristallnacht pogrom.

A new synagogue for the congregation, on Bremer Street, was completed in 2000.

== History ==
=== Construction ===
In 1827, a previous synagogue was closed due to its dilapidated state. In 1828, the government offered a new location for the construction of a new synagogue at the corner of Untere Königsstraße and Bremerstraße. Several blueprints (by August Schuchardt, Conrad Bromeis, and Julius Eugen Ruhl) were rejected by the community. Finally, a blueprint by Albrecht Rosengarten was accepted, and after three years of construction the new synagogue was opened on August 8, 1839. It was the first Rundbogenstil synagogue, and the style was widely adopted in Central Europe and abroad in the following decades.

=== Nazi rule and destruction of the synagogue ===
On November 7, 1938, in the course of Kristallnacht, the synagogue was desecrated by the Nazis; part of its interior decoration and ritual accessories were burned outside. On November 11, 1938, the city authorities decided to demolish the synagogue. A memorial plaque was installed at its former location with the following inscription:

This is the former location of the synagogue, built in 1839, of the Kassel Jewish community which consisted of 2301 members as of May 1933. Many Jews had already fled the city when, on November 7, 1938, activists of the NSDAP broke into the synagogue, destroyed the Torah Ark, and set the prayer scrolls and other objects on fire. Shortly after that, the city authorities decided to tear down the building, which had remained intact, to use the location as a parking lot. The community was destroyed.

=== Post-war period ===
A new prayer hall was built in Heubnerstraße in 1952/53. As it became too small by the 1960s, the decision was made to build a new synagogue with a community centre. On December 12, 1965, the new building with the community hall for 100 people was inaugurated.

As it in turn became too small for the growing Jewish community, another new synagogue, designed by Alfred Jacoby, in the Modernist style, built of concrete, was completed in 2000. Funds for its construction were provided by, among others, the government of Hesse, the city of Kassel, the North-Hesse administrative districts, the local branch of the Evangelical Church in Germany, the Catholic Diocese of Fulda, and through private donations.

== See also ==
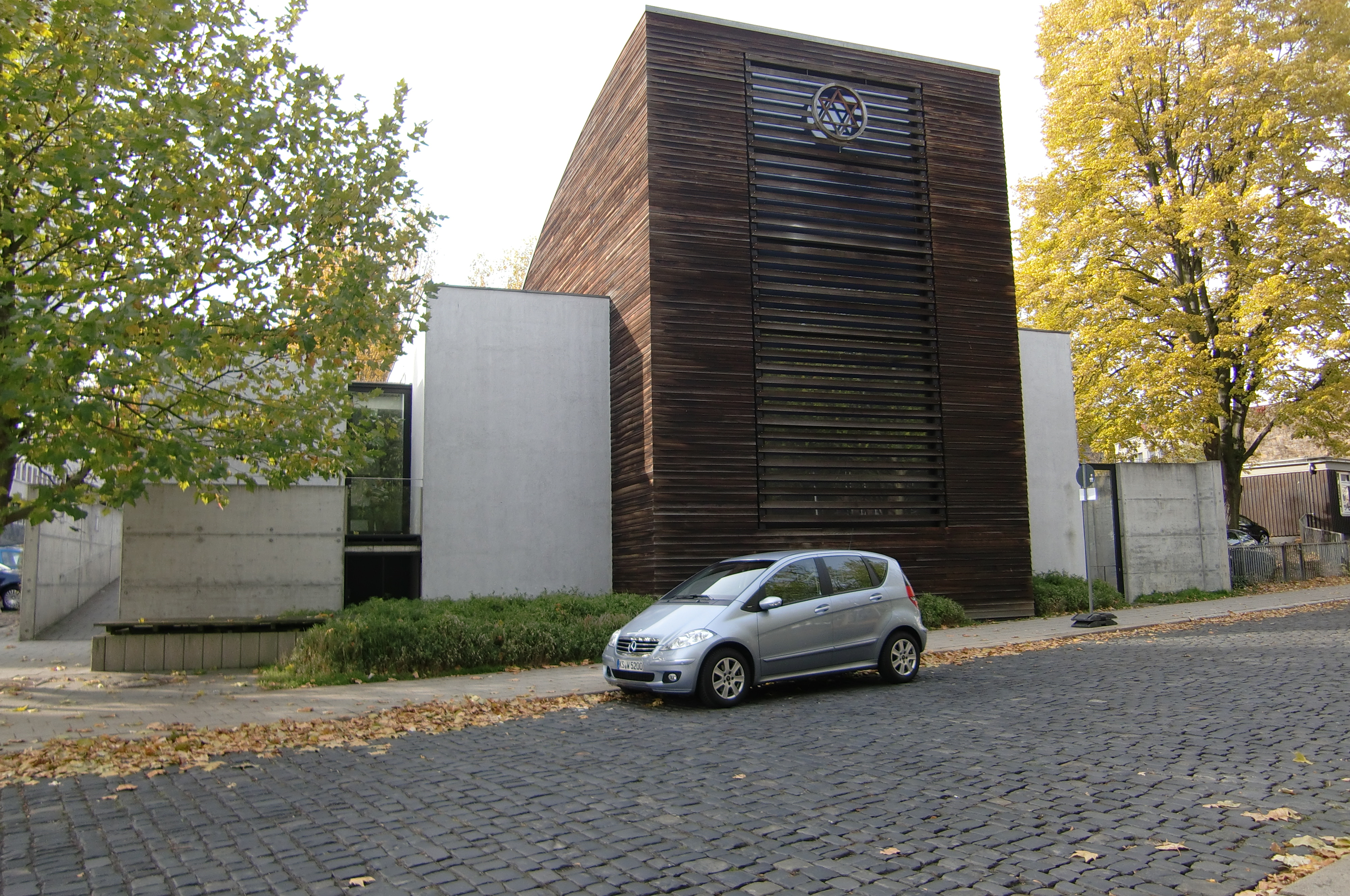
The Kassel synagogue on Bremer Street, in 2010

- History of the Jews in Germany
- List of synagogues in Germany (in German)
