= Brian Clarke =

British architectural artist and painter (1953–2025)

Sir Brian Clarke Hon FRIBA FRSA CF
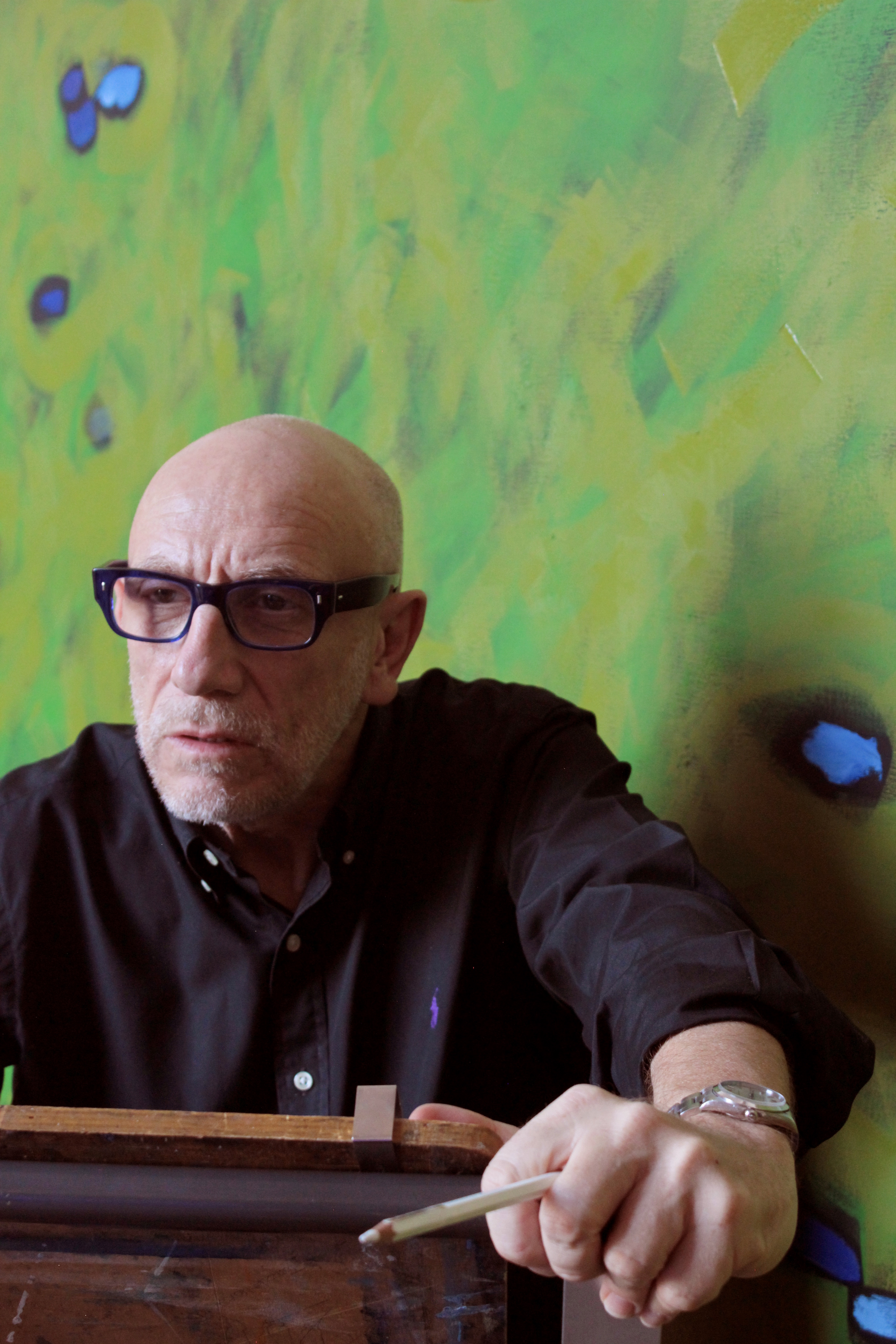
- Clarke in his studio, 2015
- Born: Brian Ord Clarke; 2 July 1953; Oldham, Lancashire, England
- Died: 1 July 2025 (aged 71)
- Education: Oldham School of Arts and Crafts; Burnley School of Art; North Devon College of Art and Design, Bideford
- Occupation: Artist
- Years active: 1971–2025
- Known for: Painting, stage design, stained glass, Gesamtkunstwerk, tapestry, mosaic, ceramics
- Notable work: Architectural Stained Glass; Royal Mosque, KKIA; Victoria Quarter, Leeds; Holocaust Memorial Synagogue, Darmstadt; Paul McCartney New World Tour; Pyramid of Peace and Reconciliation
- Spouses: Liz Finch (m. 1972; div. 1996) (m. 2013)
- Website: www.brianclarke.co.uk

Sir Brian Clarke Hon FRIBA CF (2 July 1953 – 1 July 2025) was a British painter, architectural artist, designer and printmaker, known for his large-scale stained glass and mosaic projects, symbolist paintings, set designs, and collaborations with major figures in modern and contemporary architecture.

Born to a working-class family in Oldham, in the north of England, and a full-time art student on scholarship by age 13, Clarke came to prominence in the late 1970s as a painter and figure of the Punk movement and designer of stained glass. By 1980, he had become a major figure in international contemporary art, the subject of several television documentaries and a café society regular. He was known for his architectonic art, prolific output in various media, friendships with key cultural figures, (Note: 'If the earnest boy from Oldham was bemused to find himself the toast of the glitterati, he wasn't bedazzled. "If you're a well-known plumber you meet well-known electricians, I suppose. It's just the circle you move in. And my friendships with Paul [McCartney] or [Francis] Bacon or Andy [Warhol] – that's just what happens in life. But," he adds with a glimmer of reproof, "I've got friends who aren't famous. I even have friends who aren't dead."') and polemical lectures and interviews.

His practice in architectural and autonomous stained glass, often on a monumental scale, has led to successive innovation and invention in the development of the medium. (Note: Including the early use of screen printing, incorporation of photography, the origination of techniques allowing the inclusion of two colours in a single sheet of opaque glass, and the development of bonding techniques including multi-lamination.) This includes the creation of stained glass without lead and the subsequent pioneering of a 'dramatically enhanced Pointillism' in glass, as well as the creation of sculptural stained glass works, analogous to collage, made primarily or entirely of lead. The latter two advances are described as having taken stained glass as an art form to its zero-point in each direction: absolute transparency and complete opacity. (Note: His major contributions to the medium are the removal of structural or outline-delineating lead through the production of seamless stained glass and, conversely, the production of related works created without glass, formed of calligraphic lead solder on sheet lead.)

A lifelong exponent of the integration of art and architecture, his architectural collaborations include work with Zaha Hadid, Norman Foster, Arata Isozaki, Oscar Niemeyer, I. M. Pei, César Pelli, and Renzo Piano. He served a seven-year term as chairman of The Architecture Foundation and served on the Design Review Committee of the Commission for Architecture and the Built Environment. His artistic collaborations have included work with David Bailey, Hugh Hudson, Malcolm McLaren, and with Linda McCartney and Paul McCartney.

== Background ==
Brian Clarke was born in Oldham, Lancashire, to Edward Ord Clarke, a coal miner, and Lilian Clarke (née Whitehead), a cotton spinner. Raised in a family familiar with Spiritualism – his maternal grandmother was a notable local medium – Clarke attended a Spiritualist Lyceum throughout his childhood and was considered a 'sensitive', gaining a reputation locally as a 'boy medium'. (Note: "As a teenager, I went through the usual adolescent excitements to do with quasi-religious, quasi-artistic things and the closest to home was spiritualism. So I went through all the procedures that young spiritualists in the 1960s went through and became what they call a medium. It wasn't a preoccupation that consumed much of my life but it gave me a reservoir of imagery I find thrilling. To be frank, I think my art is still in what you might call 'mediumship'.")

Aged 12, he applied for a place in the last intake of an education scheme existing in the north of England to enable artistically promising children to leave their secondary school and become full-time art students, and was awarded a scholarship to the Oldham School of Arts and Crafts. In place of a standard curriculum, he principally studied the arts and design, learning drawing, heraldry, pictorial composition, colour theory, pigment mixing and calligraphy, among other subjects. Considered a prodigy, by the age of 16 Clarke had mastered the orthodoxies of academic life drawing. In 1968, he and his family moved to Burnley and, too young at 15 to gain entrance to Burnley College of Art, he lied about his age and was accepted on the strength of his previous work.

In 1970, Clarke enrolled in the Architectural Stained Glass course at North Devon College of Art and Design, graduating from the Diploma in Design with a first class distinction. In 1974, he was awarded a Winston Churchill Memorial Travelling Fellowship to study religious art in Italy, France, and West Germany. He was inspired by the post-war German school of stained glass artists, and in particular the artist Johannes Schreiter. In 1976, Clarke received the Churchill Extension Fellowship to study art in architecture and contemporary painting in the United States, where he connected with the art of, and later befriended, Robert Rauschenberg, Jasper Johns, and Andy Warhol.

Clarke died from cancer on 1 July 2025, one day before his 72nd birthday.

== Work ==
In his career, Clarke advanced new approaches across a range of mediums including stained glass, mosaic, collage, painting and drawing.

=== 1970s ===
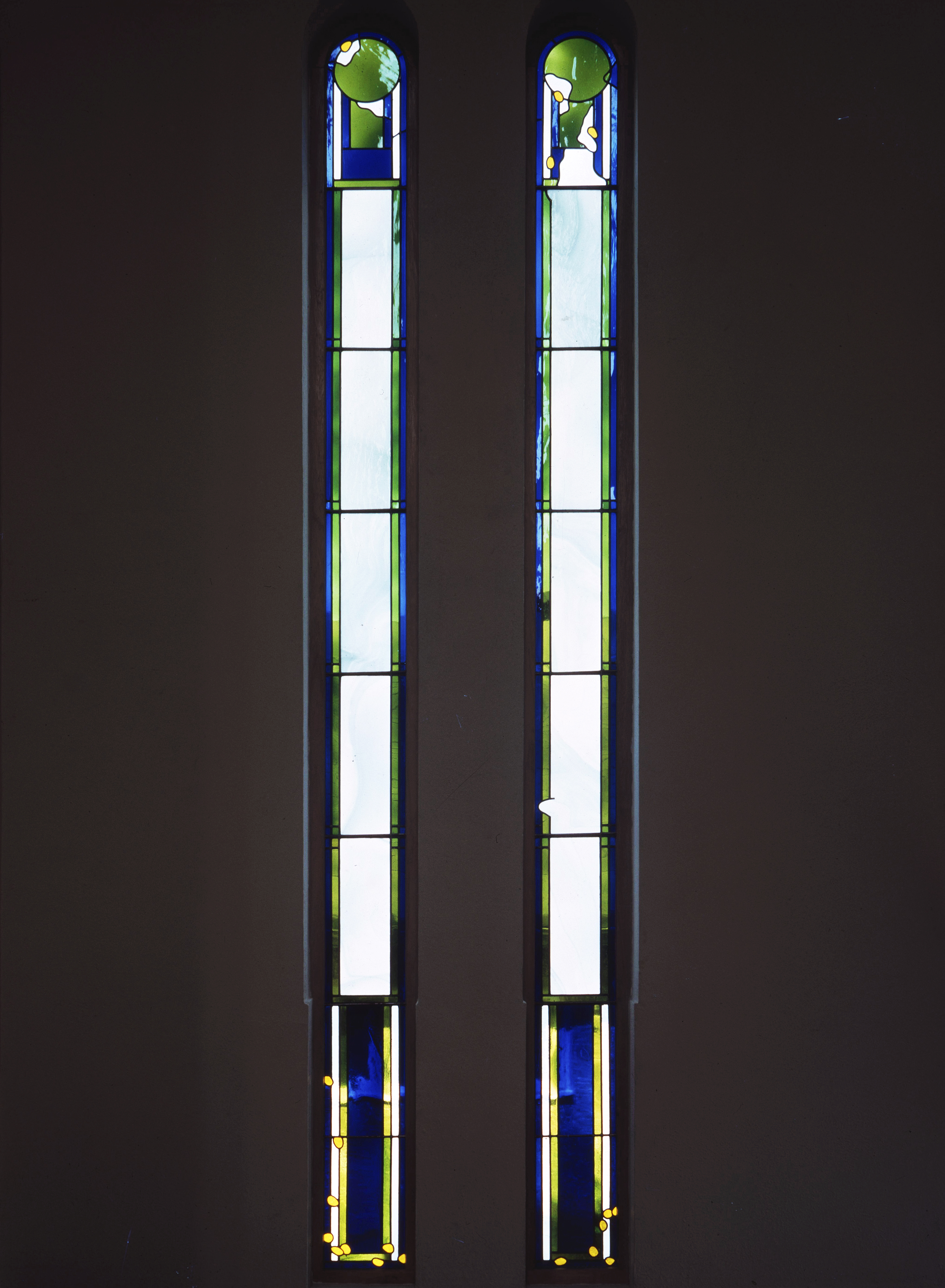
Baptistery windows designed and fabricated in 1976 by Clarke for F. X. Velarde's 1932-1934 Art Deco church of St Gabriel, Blackburn.

Clarke received his first architectural commission at the age of 17. However, his suite of 20 windows for the Church of St Lawrence, Longridge (1975) is considered his first mature work. Here, the use of transparent glass has a Pop Art sensibility; the 'see through’ panes embrace the everyday by letting the real world in. In 1976, Clarke received a large-scale commission from the University of Nottingham to produce 45 paintings, vestments, and a series of stained glass windows for a multi-faith chapel in the Queen's Medical Centre. One of the largest public art commissions of the decade, the process of design and installation was filmed by the BBC as material for a documentary.

In the early years of his career, most of Clarke's work was for religious buildings. However, by 1978, his relationship with the Church of England came to a head over the restoration of St Gabriel's Church, Blackburn, which affected windows that he had designed for the building. The resulting end of this relationship freed Clarke to create stained glass for secular contexts and advance the medium as social art. Throughout this period, Clarke was active in bringing attention to stained glass and promoting it as a modern medium. In 1975, he organised the travelling exhibition Glass Art One, which featured secular, autonomous stained glass panels inspired in part by Japanese-landscape painting. Later, he co-curated GLASS/LIGHT, an extensive survey of 20th-century stained glass, with British war artist John Piper and art historian Martin Harrison, in collaboration with the artist Marc Chagall as part of the 1978 Festival of the City of London. Clarke also produced the book Architectural Stained Glass,a polemical collection of essays.

In his painting, Clarke developed a strictly abstract Constructivist language of geometric signs; often his work had an underlying grid structure made from repetitions and variations on the cross. In later years, he would disrupt the grid with free-flowing amorphic forms. In 1977, Punk hit the UK, which had a deep impact on Clarke. He connected with Vivienne Westwood and Malcolm McLaren and later collaborated as a designer on their aborted zine Chicken, whose creation was funded by EMI and filmed by BBC's Arena. He also expressed Punk's nihilistic energy in the series of paintings, ‘Dangerous Visions’ (1977).

Around the same time, Clarke became friends with the physical chemist Lord Snow. After Snow's death, he made a tributary portfolio of screenprints; their title, The Two Cultures, referenced Snow's influential 1959 Rede Lecture on the perceived gulf between the humanities and sciences. In 1983, the Tate acquired an edition of The Two Cultures.

Between 1978 and 1979, the BBC filmed Clarke's studio practice and life for an hour-long BBC Omnibus documentary, Brian Clarke: The Story So Far. Millions watched the documentary in the UK, and the BBC recorded multiple viewer complaints. The programme and subsequent press coverage, including Clarke's appearance on the cover of Vogue, photographed by Robert Mapplethorpe, brought him to broader public attention. Later in 1979, Clarke became a presenter on the BBC2 arts programme Mainstream and the BBC Radio 4 programme Kaleidescope, conducting interviews with figures including Brassaï, Andy Warhol, John Lennon, and Elisabeth Lutyens. He also gave Sheffield band The Human League their first television appearance.

=== 1980s ===
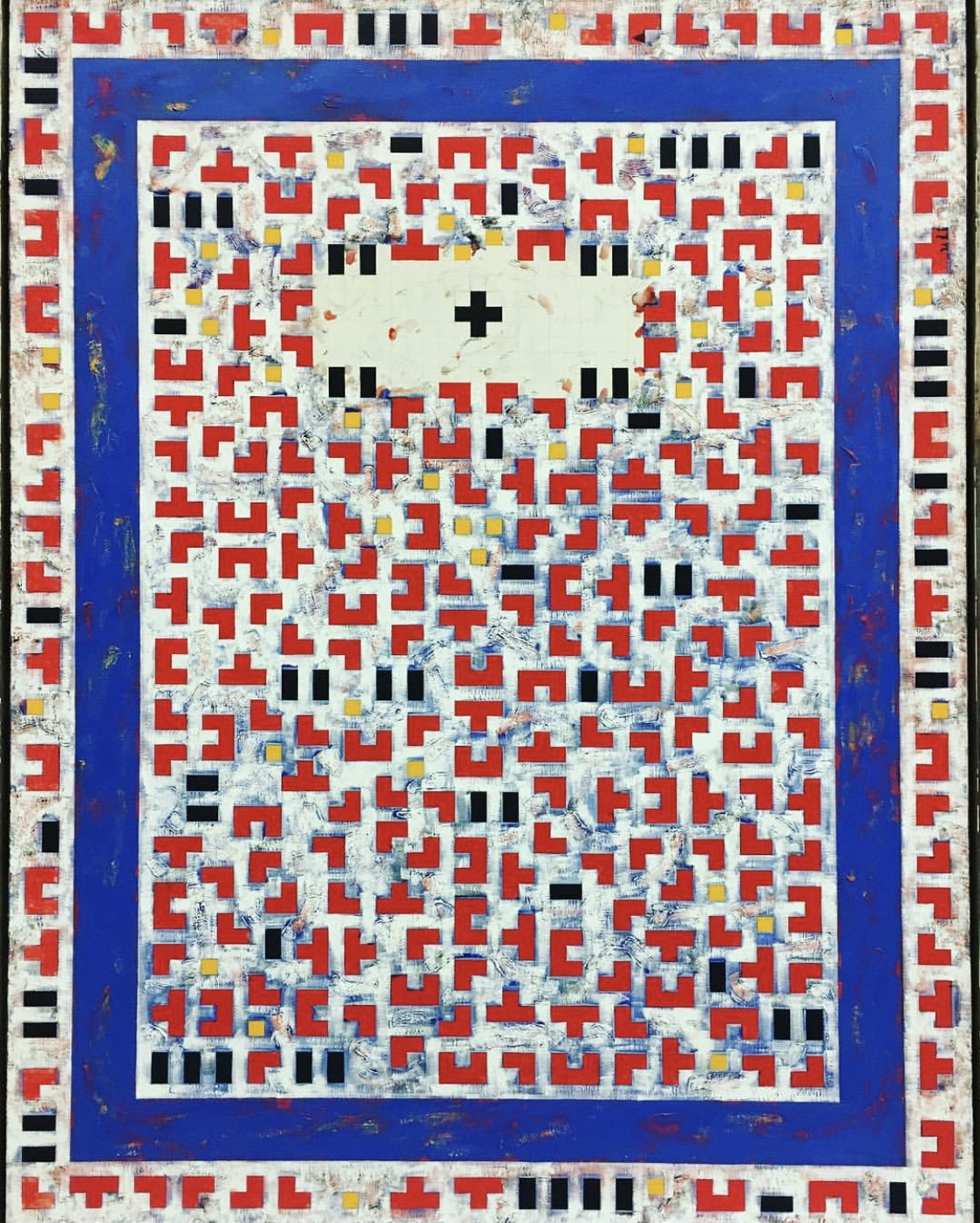
Oil painting by Clarke from the Via Crucis series, titled And He is Condemned (1983), exhibited at the reopening of the Robert Fraser Gallery

In the 1980s, Clarke was instrumental in bringing stained glass into the public sphere. He received his first international commission for paintings, a wooden construction, and a suite of stained glass windows for the Olympus European Headquarters Building in Hamburg, completed in 1981. Marking a major shift in his own practice and breaking with tradition, he had the windows made at a studio in Germany. The experience of their immersive colour prompted critics to describe them as the Colour Field of stained glass. Another development in this work is Clarke's liberation of the lead line from being a purely structural element: where the lead breaks free, it takes on an expressive quality. In the same year, receiving a commission from the Government of Saudi Arabia for the Royal Mosque of King Khalid International Airport, Clarke studied Islamic ornament at the Quran schools in Fez. Following this, in 1984, the architectural practice Derek Latham and Co. asked Clarke to collaborate on the refurbishment of Henry Currey's Grade II listed Thermal Baths in Buxton. Satisfying his public ambitions for the medium, he enclosed the former Victorian spa in a barrel-vaulted skin of stained glass, bathing the space “in an immense blue light”. It is one of Clarke's earliest works to have been designed to have a deliberate nocturnal presence.

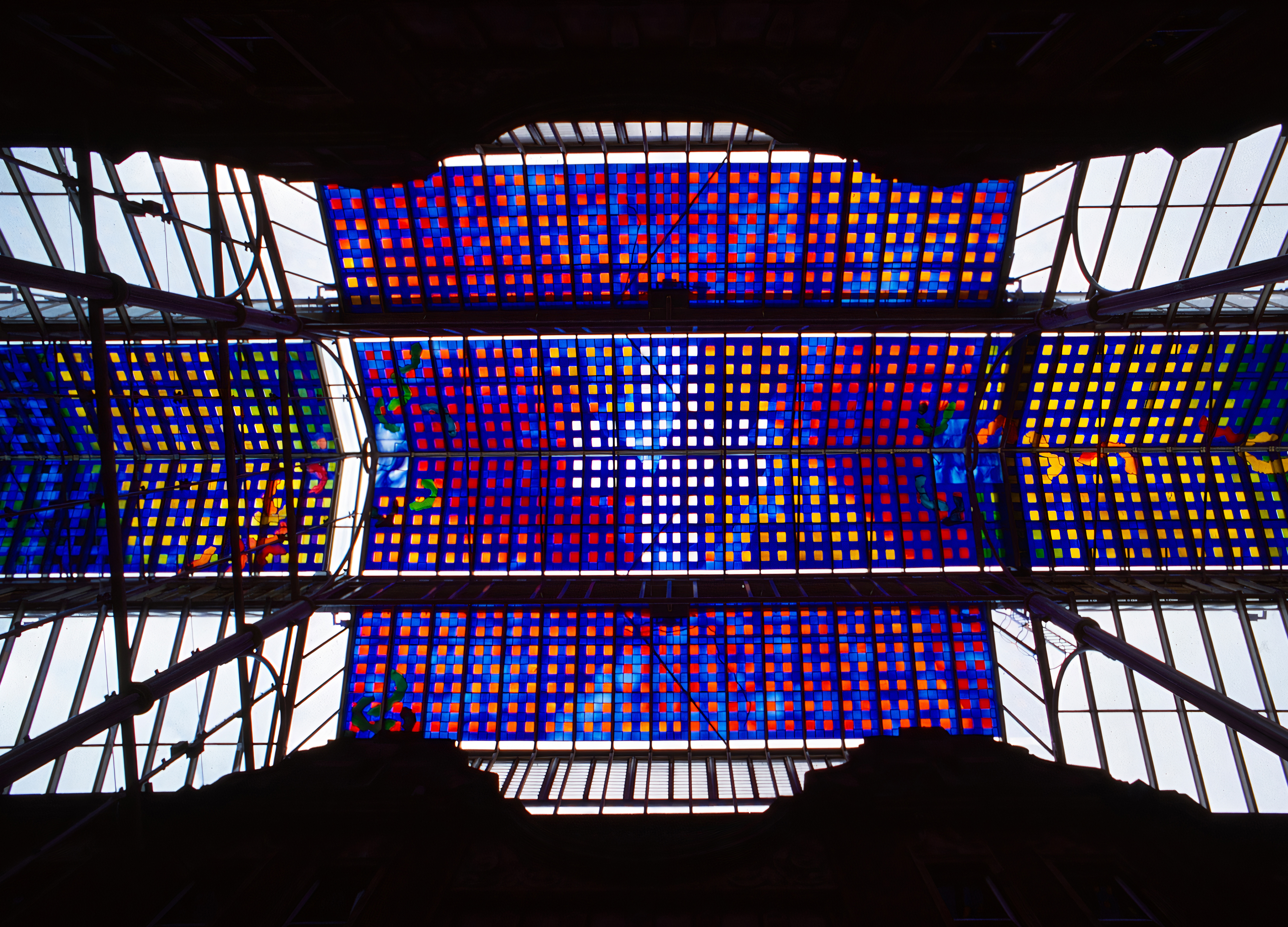
Victoria Quarter Leeds modern abstract stained glass canopy by Brian Clarke at Cross Arcade junction, 1990

In 1988, architect Arata Isozaki approached Clarke to collaborate on the Lake Sagami Building in Yamanishi. Clarke designed a composition of stained glass for the central lantern and a series of interrelated skylights that referenced elements of Isozaki's building. In the same period, Clarke collaborated with Norman Foster and his architectural practice Foster + Partners to design stained glass for Stansted Airport's new terminal building. For the first time in the history of stained glass, computer-assisted design was utilised in its visualisation and design. Partly for security reasons, the design could not be used. The final commission was for two friezes and a 6-metre high tower of stained glass. While their abstract, constructivist forms resonated with Foster's language, Clarke recently expressed how the medieval technology of lead and stained glass was at odds with the material qualities of High-tech architecture. An urge to resolve this conflict later spurred Clarke to embrace the most cutting-edge glass technology.

Equally experimental across other mediums, Clarke's painting practice was also inspired by technology. Noticing the similarity between the reticular, Constructivist-derived symbols that dominated his work and the light-metering computergrams from Olympus OM System cameras, he produced a series of technology-related paintings, including Time Lag Zero, for the headquarters of Olympus Optical (UK). During this period, Clarke produced the cover painting for Paul McCartney's solo album Tug of War, designing the cover with Linda McCartney. He also created the stage designs for Paul McCartney's World Tour (1989–90).

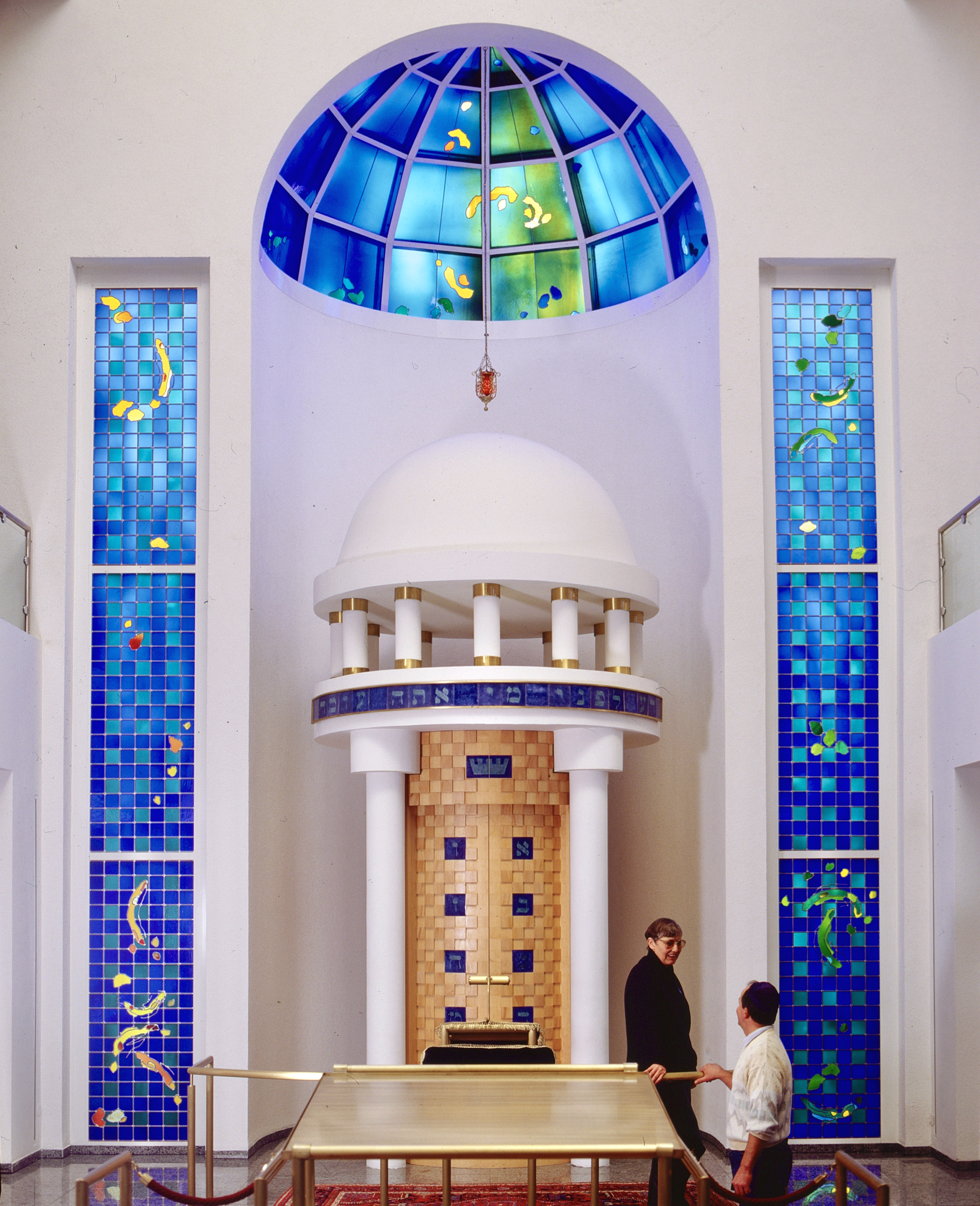
The stained glass windows and dome, and ceramic and carved wood Torah ark of the New Synagogue, Darmstadt, designed by Clarke

=== 1990s ===
Continuing to work collaboratively with leading architects, Clarke started to challenge the traditional containment of stained glass within a frame and fashion entire facades from glass. When Future Systems (the architectural practice of Jan Kaplický and Amanda Levete) asked Clarke to collaborate on The Glass Dune (1992), he proposed an internal ‘skin of art’ for their innovative boomerang-shaped building, which was never realised. Collaborating later with expressionist architect Will Alsop on the design of Hôtel du Département des Bouches du Rhône (which became known as Le Grand Bleu), Clarke clad the building in an Yves Klein blue glass. A landmark in the city of Marseille, the building is now considered a major work of late 20th-century architecture.

Desiring lighter and more expansive fields of glass, Clarke continued searching for new technologies. Working with architect Zaha Hadid on a proposal for the Spittelau Viaducts Housing Project, Vienna, he developed a new type of mouth-blown glass, which he christened 'Zaha-Glas'. Although this project was never realised, the newly developed 'Zaha-Glas' was first used architecturally in Clarke's scheme for the ceiling of Pfizer World Headquarters in New York, a landmark architectural art project that connected 42nd and 43rd Streets in Manhattan. Working with Foster on the design for the Al Faisaliyah Centre, Riyadh, Saudi Arabia (installed 1999), Clarke abandoned the medieval technology of glass and supportive lead entirely and conceived a novel solution that involved firing a ceramic frit glaze into float glass. The new glass had a lightness that matched Norman Foster's High-tech building. Clarke, however, continued to use traditional, medieval technologies in other architectural contexts.

Clarke continued to be active in other mediums in addition to stained glass. In 1993, he created the set designs for Paul McCartney's New World Tour (1993); one of the sets was a collage of stained glass through the ages. The following year, Clarke had a joint show with Linda McCartney. The exhibition, Collaborations, showed works by both artists and collaborative pieces in which McCartney's photos were silkscreened onto mouth-blown glass using a process of their own devising.

In 1998, the English High Court severed all ties between Francis Bacon's former gallery, Marlborough Fine Art, and the Estate of Francis Bacon. Clarke was appointed sole executor of the Estate of Francis Bacon, acting on behalf of Bacon's heir John Edwards. Clarke transferred representation of Francis Bacon to the Tony Shafrazi Gallery in New York, where an exhibition was mounted of seventeen previously unseen Bacon paintings recovered from his studio. Clarke brought a second court case against Marlborough Fine Art, alleging that the gallery had underpaid Bacon for his work, asserted undue influence over him, and failed to account for up to 33 of his paintings. Following Edwards' diagnosis with lung cancer in 2002, the litigation was settled out of court, with each side paying its own costs. During the legal process an undisclosed number of Bacon's paintings were recovered from Marlborough, and "vast quantities of correspondence and documents relating to the life of the artist were handed over by the gallery".

In 1998, Edwards and Clarke donated the contents of Bacon's studio at 7 Reece Mews, London, left untouched since Bacon's death, to the Hugh Lane, the Dublin City Gallery. What followed was a unique conservation project. A decision was taken to preserve the studio as it stood, and a team of archaeologists, art historians, conservators, and curators were involved in the move from London to Dublin. The locations of over 7,000 items were documented, and in Dublin, the studio was rebuilt using all the original doors, flooring, walls, and ceiling, and the items were placed exactly as they were left. The studio opened to the public in 2001, accompanied by the first-ever database to list the contents of an artist's studio.

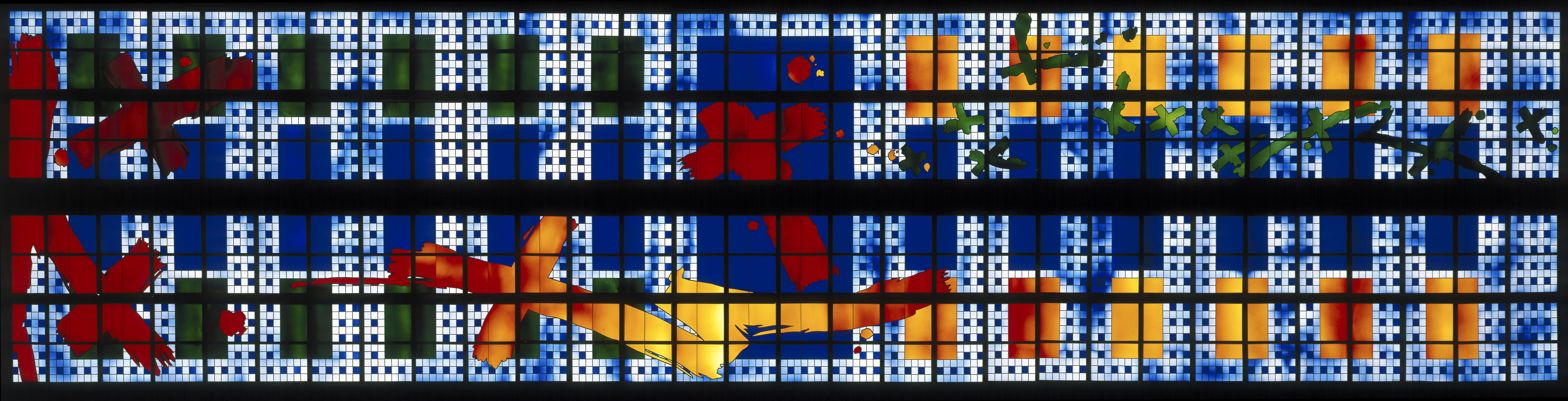
Stained glass skylight by Clarke, 120 sq metres total. Inspired by William Walton's Orb and Sceptre Coronation March and executed for The Spindles in Oldham (1993)

=== 2000s ===
Continuing to advance his architectural vision for stained glass, in 2005 Clarke orchestrated the site-specific exhibition Lamina at the Gagosian Gallery, London, where floor to ceiling stained glass depicting golden leaves transformed the gallery space and immersed the visitors illuminated natural forms. Nature became a central theme for Clarke's work in these years. In an interview, Clarke acknowledged feeling close to Henri Matisse, who had worked in stained glass and whose work often glorified the wonders of nature. Nature also inspired Clarke's stained glass and ceramic works at Chiswick Mall in West London. Clarke worked with Norman Foster on the Palace of Peace and Reconciliation, a landmark building in Nur-Sultan, Kazakhstan, built to house the triennial Congress of Leaders of World and Traditional Religions. Clarke's 9,700 square expanse of stained glass crowns the apex of the pyramid (installed 2006), featuring imagery of soaring doves.

In another example of Clarke breaking the medieval relationship between glass and lead, in the 2000s he took the radical step to invert their relationship and began fashioning works entirely of lead. In these autonomous lead works, Clarke often uses the somber weightiness of lead to explore darker themes like mortality. His leadwork Don't Forget the Lamb (2014) is a memorial to his late mother. In this period, nature inspired Clarke's work in other mediums as well. His drawings of flowers use negative space as an expressive element, isolating the flowers in empty space with his signature, nervy line. This is seen in his later series, 'Night Orchids', exhibited at PACE Gallery in 2016. Clarke's collages are equally experimental; the carefully chosen, often torn, fragments and chalk drawings build an image that attempts to capture the essence of the flower depicted. In a radical gesture, Clarke brought the language of collage to stained glass in a wrap-around window at Peel Cottage (installed 2009), where he incorporated fragments of medieval glass within a contemporary design.

=== 2010s to 2020s ===
In 2010, Clarke was commissioned to design stained windows for the new Papal Chapel of the Apostolic Nunciature, the diplomatic embassy of the Holy See to Great Britain, for the 2010 visit of Pope Benedict XVI to the United Kingdom, the first-ever state visit made by a pope to Britain. The exhibition The Art of Light (2018) in Norwich highlighted Clarke's free-standing glass panels. While their folding structures draw inspiration from Japanese folding screens, they explore a new context for stained glass, no longer confined to the fabric of a building, but nevertheless having a strong architectural impact on whatever space they inhabit. The subject matter of these panels is diverse: many depict flowers and nature's opulence in vivid colour, but there are also images of intense grief and Pop-inspired subject matter. A Pop sensibility also runs through his Caryatids panels (2002), which depict muscular young men in beachwear by the sea. The work received criticism when it was shown at Christie's, London in 2011, reflective of the traditionalist values that surround the medium of stained glass.

In 2015, Clarke curated A Strong Sweet Smell of Incense: A Portrait of Robert Fraser, an exhibition held at the Royal Academy of Arts in London, in association with Pace Gallery, together with author Harriet Vyner (whose 'cult biography' of Fraser, Groovy Bob, Clarke had contributed to). The 2014 solo exhibition Spitfires and Primroses with the Pace Gallery, juxtaposed two recent series of works, pairing oil paintings of the Second World War aircraft, arranged in a heraldic semé, with watercolours of English primroses. The show revealed an underlying disquiet to Clarke's botanical imagery. This aspect resonated later in his paintings of poppies, which formed the exhibition Vespers at Phillips, London in 2021.

In 2020, it was announced that a new Blue Coat School was to be built in Oldham, Clarke's hometown, named the Brian Clarke Church of England Academy, to provide free school places to 1,200 pupils. The academy was granted planning permission in April 2021, with construction completed in 2023, and its first intake of pupils in September 2023.

Clarke also designed the stained glass windows for the new extension to Westminster Coroner's Court, which opened in 2024; The Guardian's Rowan Moore described them as "realised with virtuosity in the handling of depth and density of colour, meant to convey growth and renewal"; Clarke himself explained that the windows were intended "not to give people an artistic ecstasy, but to say ‘I am with you’, ‘I know what you’re going through’, to put an arm around people’s shoulders."

In 2025, Clarke completed the stained glass installation Concordia at Bahrain International Airport, commissioned by Prince and Prime Minister Salman bin Hamad Al Khalifa. Measuring 34 m by 17 m (578 m²), it is among the world’s largest stained glass works ever realised. The design brings together Islamic geometric patterns and elements inspired by the region of Bahrain, including jasmine flowers, dragonflies and hawks, alongside Western motifs such as oak leaves and daffodils. Concordia represents a major achievement in Clarke’s mature work. As he stated, “Everything I have ever learned about stained glass is in some ways expressed in this window.”

== Selected projects ==
=== Selected realised projects ===
- 1976: Stained glass for the east window of All Saints Church, Habergham, Burnley
- 1977: Paintings, vestments and stained glass for the design of the Queen's Medical Centre Chapel, University of Nottingham
- 1981: Stained glass for the Lavers & Barraud Building, Endell Street, London
- 1981: Paintings and stained glass for the lobby of Olympus Optical Europa GmbH, Headquarters Building, Hamburg
- 1982: Stained glass for the skylight and clerestory, main hall, library and office of the King Khalid International Airport Mosque, Riyadh
- 1984: Doha Palace, designed a series of sculptural stained glass and windows for the new Government Building, Doha, Qatar
- 1986: Modular Assemblage (painting installation) for Texas Instruments headquarters, Dallas, Texas
- 1986: Stained glass barrel-vaulted roof of the Cavendish Arcade, Derbyshire
- 1988: Stained glass for the central lantern tower and skylights of the Lake Sagami Country Club, Yamanishi, Japan
- 1988: Stained glass and Torah shrine for the Holocaust Memorial Synagogue (Neue Synagoge), Darmstadt
- 1989: Creation of stained-glass covered arcade at the Victoria Quarter, Leeds
- 1989: Stage sets for the Paul McCartney World Tour
- 1989: Stained glass roofs for the Spindles Shopping Centre, Oldham
- 1990 Painting and stained glass for Cibreo Restaurant, Tokyo
- 1991: Stained glass frieze and tower, Stansted Airport
- 1992: Stained glass tower windows for Edificio Telefonica, Barcelona Telephone Exchange, Placa Catalunya, for the 1992 Summer Olympics
- 1992: Tapestries and stained glass for Associated Newspapers headquarters, the Carmelite, Victoria Embankment, London
- 1993: Designed the stage sets for the Paul McCartney New World Tour
- 1993: Stained glass for the North wall of the EAM Building, Kassel, Germany
- 1993: Stage sets for The Ruins of Time, Rudolf Nureyev tribute ballet, choreographed by Wayne Eagling, Dutch National Ballet, Amsterdam
- 1994: Mosaic for W.H. Smith & Sons, Mill Hill House, Abingdon, Oxon
- 1994: Compact disc covers of the Sir William Walton music catalogue, EMI Classical
- 1995: Stained glass roof lights and mosaic for Centre NorteShopping, Rio de Janeiro
- 1995: Stained glass windows for the Cistercian Abbaye de la Fille Dieu, Romont
- 1995: Stained glass and mosaic ceiling for Pfizer Pharmaceuticals World Headquarters, Emery Roth and Sons Building, New York
- 1996: Stained glass façade for Valentino Village, Noci, Bari
- 1996: Sculptural stained glass artwork (The Stamford Cone) for UBS, Swiss Bank Corporation headquarters, Stamford, Connecticut
- 1997: Stained glass for The Chicago Sinai Synagogue
- 2000: Stained glass facade and mosaic floor for Olympus Optical Europa Headquarters, Hamburg
- 2000: Stained glass wall for Al-Faisliah Complex, Riyadh
- 2001: Stained glass facade for Pfizer Inc, 42nd Street & 2nd Ave, New York
- 2005: Design for stained glass for the choir windows, Linkoping Cathedral, Sweden
- 2006: Stained glass apex and windows of the Pyramid of Peace, Astana
- 2010: Stained glass for the Papal Chapel of the Apostolic Nunciature, London
- 2011: Mosaic entrance hall for private home, St. James’, London
- 2015: Stained glass, mosaic, ceramics tiles and door and window furniture for a private house in Chiswick Mall, London
- 2015: Design of the new Fellowship Medallion for the Winston Churchill Memorial Trust
- 2018: Design of the Beaverbrook Country Club Coach House Spa, Cherkley Court
- 2018: St James’ Gesamtkunstwerk: entrance hall of private London home, St James’ Park
- 2021: Stained glass, The Red Room Bar, Connaught Hotel, London
- 2024: Stained glass, Westminster Coroner's Court, London
- 2025: Concordia, Bahrain International Airport, Bahrain

=== Selected unrealised projects ===
- 1992: The Glass Dune (Ministry of Environment Building), Hamburg, Germany
- 1994: Stained glass window for Clinical Research Building and Hammersmith Hospital Cancer Centre with Jan Kaplický (Future Systems)
- 1994: Designs for stained glass ceiling and mosaic floor for Friedrichstadt Passagen, Quartier 206, Berlin
- 1994: Collaborative proposal with Zaha Hadid for stained glass and mosaic at Spittelau Viaducts Housing Project, Vienna
- 1994: Designs for stained glass and Torah ark for Aachen Synagogue
- 1995: Design for stained glass wall for the refurbishment of the entrance lobby of the United Nations Headquarters, New York
- 1996: Proposal for the Great Auditorium Paris Opera, Bastille
- 1997: Design for stained glass and mosaic, RWE Energie AG Headquarters, Essen, Germany
- 1997: Designs for windows of Heiliggeist-Kirche, Heidelberg, Germany
- 1997: Design for stained glass, Chep Lap Kok Airport, Hong Kong
- 1998: Design for stained glass roof and water sculptures for Neiman Marcus and Fashion Show Mall, Las Vegas, Nevada, USA
- 2000: Design for a glass sculpture, Holborn Place, London
- 2001: Design for stained glass facade for West Winter Garden, Canary Wharf, London
- 2003: Stained glass design for south elevation façade, Great South Grandstand, Ascot Racecourse
- 2011: Design for cast bronze and stained glass plaza sculpture, The Shard, London Bridge
- 2017: Designs for stained glass transept windows, Salisbury Cathedral

== Recognition and roles ==
- 1983–2020: Council Member, Winston Churchill Memorial Trust
- 1989 onwards: Fellow of the Royal Society of Arts
- 1992: Visiting professor, Centre del Vidre, Barcelona
- 1993–present: Honorary Fellow of the Royal Institute of British Architects
- 1994: Visiting professor of Architectural Art, Bartlett Institute of Architecture, UCL
- 1995–2008: Trustee, The Stained Glass Museum, Ely
- 1998 onwards: Chairman and sole executor of The Estate of Francis Bacon
- 2000–2005: Board member, Design Review Committee for the Commission of Architecture and the Built Environment
- 2001 onwards: Governor of Capital City Academy
- 2001 onwards: Trustee, The Lowe Educational Charitable Foundation
- 2002–2013: Trustee, The Architecture Foundation
- 2007–2013: Chairman of The Architecture Foundation
- 2007–2020: Trustee, Winston Churchill Memorial Trust
- 2016 onwards: Chairman and trustee of the Zaha Hadid Foundation

== Awards and honours ==
- 1974: Winston Churchill Memorial Trust Fellowship
- 1975: Churchill Fellowship Extension
- 1988: Europa Nostra Award: Gold Medal (Cavendish Arcade, Buxton)
- 1991: Leeds Award for Architecture (Victoria Quarter); Civic Trust Award (Victoria Quarter)
- 1996: Award for Fine Architecture, Heidelberg
- 2007: Honorary D.Litt., Huddersfield University
- 2012: Honorary Liveryman, Worshipful Company of Glaziers and Master Glass Painters
- 2018: Doctor of Humane Letters, Virginia Theological Seminary
- 2021: Honorary Fellow, Arts University Bournemouth

Clarke was knighted in the 2024 New Year Honours for services to art.

== Selected exhibitions ==
- 1975: Brian Clarke: Glass Art One, Mid-Pennine Arts Association, Arts Council of Great Britain.
- 1979: GLASS/LIGHT (with John Piper and Marc Chagall), Festival of the City of London.
- 1981: Brian Clarke: New Paintings, Constructions and Prints (with the Robert Fraser Gallery), Royal Institute of British Architects, London.
- 1982: British Stained Glass, Centre International du Vitrail, Chartres, France.
- 1982: Brian Clarke - Serigraphien und Mosaik, Franz Mayer'sche Hofkunstanstalt, Munich.
- 1983: Brian Clarke: Paintings, opening exhibition of the new Robert Fraser Gallery, London.
- 1983: Black/White (with Jean-Michel Basquiat), Robert Fraser Gallery, London.
- 1986: Brian Clarke: Stained Glass, Seibu Museum of Art, Yurakacho, Tokyo.
- 1987: Brian Clarke: Paintings, 1976 - 1986, Seibu Museum of Art, Ikebukuro, Tokyo; Yao Seibu Exhibition Hall, Yao, Osaka.
- 1988: Brian Clarke, Malerei und Farbfenster 1977 - 1988, Hessisches Landesmuseum Darmstadt.
- 1988: Die Architektur der Synagoge (Architecture of the Synagogue), Deutsches Architekturmuseum (German Architecture Museum), Frankfurt.
- 1989: Brian Clarke: Paintings, The Indar Pasricha Gallery, Hauz Khas, New Delhi; Pyrri Art Centre, Savolinna.
- 1990: Brian Clarke: Into and Out of Architecture, The Mayor Gallery, London.
- 1990: Brian Clarke: Architecture and Stained Glass, Sezon Museum of Art, Tokyo.
- 1992: Light and Architecture (in collaboration with Future Systems), Ingolstadt.
- 1993: Images of Christ, Northampton Museum; St. Paul's Cathedral, London.
- 1993: Brian Clarke: Designs on Architecture, Oldham Art Gallery, Oldham.
- 1993: Architettura e Spazio Sacro nella Modernita (Architecture and the Sacred Space in the Modern Age) (with architect Alfred Jacoby), Venice Biennale of Architecture.
- 1998: The Glass Wall, Tony Shafrazi Gallery, New York.
- 1998: Brian Clarke—Linda McCartney: Collaborations, Musée Suisse du Vitrail, Romont, Switzerland; Deutsche Glasmalerei-Museum, Linnich, Germany.
- 2002: Brian Clarke: Transillumination, Tony Shafrazi Gallery, New York.
- 2002: Flowers for New York, Steuben Gallery, Corning Museum, New York.
- 2005: Lamina, Gagosian Gallery, London.
- 2011:The Quick and the Dead, Gemeentemuseum Den Haag.
- 2011: Brian Clarke: Works on Paper 1969-2011, Phillips de Pury, Saatchi Gallery, London.
- 2013: Between Extremities, Pace Gallery, New York.
- 2014: Piper & Clarke. Stained Glass: Art or Anti-Art, The Verey Gallery and Eton College, Eton.
- 2015: Spitfires and Primroses, PACE London.
- 2016: Night Orchids, PACE London.
- 2018: Brian Clarke: The Art of Light, Sainsbury Centre for Visual Arts, Norwich.
- 2020: Brian Clarke: On Line, Arts University Bournemouth; Brian Clarke: The Art of Light, Museum of Arts and Design, New York.
- 2021: Vespers, Phillips Berkeley Square, London.
- 2021: Brian Clarke: Canticles, HENI Gallery, London, United Kingdom.
- 2023–2024: Brian Clarke: A Great Light, Newport Street Gallery, London, United Kingdom.

== Television and film ==
- BBC Omnibus – Brian Clarke: The Story So Far. Diana Lashmore, BBC One, 15 March 1979.
- Mainstream (presenter). BBC Two, 1979.
- Time Lag Zero: Impressions of Brian Clarke. Celebration, Granada Television, 1980.
- Linda McCartney: Behind the Lens (contributor). Nicholas Caxton, Arena, BBC One, 1992.
- Architecture of the Imagination - The Window (contributor). Mark Kidel, BBC Two, 1994.
- Architecture of the Imagination - The Stairway (contributor). Mark Kidel, BBC Two, 1994.
- Omnibus – Norman Foster (contributor). Mark Kidel, BBC One, 1995.
- Eye over Prague/Jan Kaplický – Oko Nad Prahou (contributor). Olga Špátová, 2010.
- Frank Brangwyn: Stained Glass – a catalogue (contributor). Malachite Art Films/Libby Horner, 2010.
- Colouring Light: Brian Clarke - An Artist Apart. With contributions from Sir Peter Cook, Dame Zaha Hadid, and Martin Harrison. Mark Kidel, BBC Four, 2011.

== Bibliography ==
=== Publications ===
- Architectural Stained Glass, Brian Clarke. With contributions by John Piper, Patrick Reyntiens, Johannes Schreiter and Robert Sowers. Architectural Record Books, McGraw Hill, New York, 1979. ISBN 0-07-011264-9
- WORK, Brian Clarke. Steidl Verlag, 2009. ISBN 978-3-86521-633-5
- Christophe, Brian Clarke. Steidl Verlag, 2009.
- A Strong Sweet Smell of Incense: A Portrait of Robert Fraser, Brian Clarke, with Harriet Vyner. Pace Gallery London, 2015. ISBN 978-1-909406-16-2

=== Contributions ===
- David Bailey's Trouble and Strife. Thames and Hudson, 1980.
- Into The Silent Land. Yoshihiko Ueda, Kyoto Shoin, 1990.
- Glasbilder Johannes Schreiter: 1987 – 1997, 'A cry in the wilderness'. Beispiel Darmstadt, 1997.
- Groovy Bob: The Life and Times of Robert Fraser. Harriet Vyner, Faber & Faber, 1999.
- Paul McCartney: Paintings, Bulfinch, 2000. ISBN 978-0821226735
- Ludwig Schaffrath (1924-2011) – an appreciation, The Journal of Stained Glass, Vol. XXXIV. The British Society of Master Glass Painters, 2010. ISBN 978-0-9568762-0-1
- Burne-Jones: Vast acres and fleeting ecstasies, The Journal of Stained Glass, Vol. XXXV. The British Society of Master Glass Painers, 2011. ISBN 978-0-9568762-1-8

=== Monographs and catalogues ===
- Brian Clarke: Working Drawings. With contributions by John Piper and Patrick Reyntiens. Salisbury: St. Edmunds Arts Centre, 1979.
- Brian Clarke. By Martin Harrison. With contributions by Johannes Schreiter and Patrick Reyntiens. London: Quartet Books, 1981. ISBN 0-7043-2281-1
- Brian Clarke: Paintings. London: Robert Fraser Gallery, 1983.
- Brian Clarke: Microcosm (Stained Glass and Paintings). Tokyo: The Sezon Museum of Modern Art, 1987.
- Brian Clarke: Malerei und Farbfenster 1977-1988. With contributions by Johannes Schreiter and Sir Peter Cook. Darmstadt: Hessisches Landesmuseum, 1988. ISBN 3-926527-13-7
- Brian Clarke: Into and Out of Architecture. With contributions by Sir Norman Foster, Sir Peter Cook, Arata Isozaki, Ryu Niimi and Paul Beldock. London: The Mayor Gallery, 1990.
- Brian Clarke. With contributions by Paul Beldock. Japan: Art Random and Kyoto Shoin International, 1990.
- Brian Clarke: Designs on Architecture. Introduction by Paul Beldock. Oldham: Oldham Art Gallery, 1993.
- Brian Clarke: Architectural Artist. London: Academy Editions, 1994. ISBN 1-85490-343-8
- Les Vitraux de la Fille-Dieu de Brian Clarke/Die Glasgemälde der Fille-Dieu von Brian Clarke. Edited by: L'Abbaye Cistercienne de la Fille-Dieu à Romont, Museée suisse du vitrail à Romont. Bern: Benteli, 1997. ISBN 9783716510865
- Brian Clarke—Linda McCartney: Collaborations. Edited by: Stefan Trümpler, Musée suisse du vitrail à Romont. Bern: Benteli, 1997.
- 'Fleur de Lys': Brian Clarke. London: Faggionato Fine Arts, 1998.
- Brian Clarke – Projects. New York: Tony Shafrazi Gallery, 1998. ISBN 978-1-891475-13-9
- Brian Clarke – Transillumination. Edited by: Martin Harrison. New York: Tony Shafrazi Gallery, 2002. ISBN 1-891475-22-3
- Brian Clarke – Lamina. With contributions by Martin Harrison. London: Gagosian Gallery, 2005. ISBN 1-932598-18-9
- Don't Forget the Lamb. New York: Phillips de Pury & Company, 2008.
- Christophe. Steidl, 2009. ISBN 978-3865217721
- Brian Clarke: Life and Death. Edited by: Stefan Trümpler. Romont: Vitromusée Romont, 2010. ISBN 978-3716516713
- Brian Clarke: Atlantes & Astragals. With contributions by Martin Harrison and Hans Janssen. London: Christie's, 2011.
- Brian Clarke: Works on Paper 1969–2011. London: Phillips de Pury and Company, 2011.
- Brian Clarke: Between Extremities. With contributions by Martin Harrison and Robert C. Morgan. New York: PACE Gallery, 2013. ISBN 978-1-935410-39-3
- Spitfires and Primroses 2012-2014/Works 1977-1985. With contributions by Amanda Harrison and Martin Harrison. London: PACE Gallery, 2015. ISBN 978-1909406155
- Night Orchids. With contributions by Robert Storr. London: HENI Publishing, 2016. ISBN 978-0993316104
- The Art of Light – Brian Clarke. With contributions by Sir Norman Foster and Paul Greenhalgh. London: HENI Publishing and Sainsbury Centre for Visual Arts, 2018.
- Brian Clarke: On Line. Poole: TheGallery, Arts University Bournemouth, 2020. ISBN 978-0-901196-82-8
- Spitfires. London: HENI Publishing, 2020. ISBN 978-1-912122-01-1
- Vespers. Introductory essay by Robert Storr. London: HENI Publishing, 2021. ISBN 978-1-912122-35-6
- Brian Clarke: Collages. Foreword by Joe Hage, interview by Hans Ulrich Obrist. London: HENI Publishing, September 2023. ISBN 978-1-912122-79-0
- Brian Clarke: A Great Light. Preface and interview by Hans Ulrich Obrist. London: HENI Publishing, October 2023. ISBN 978-1-912122-76-9

== Gallery ==
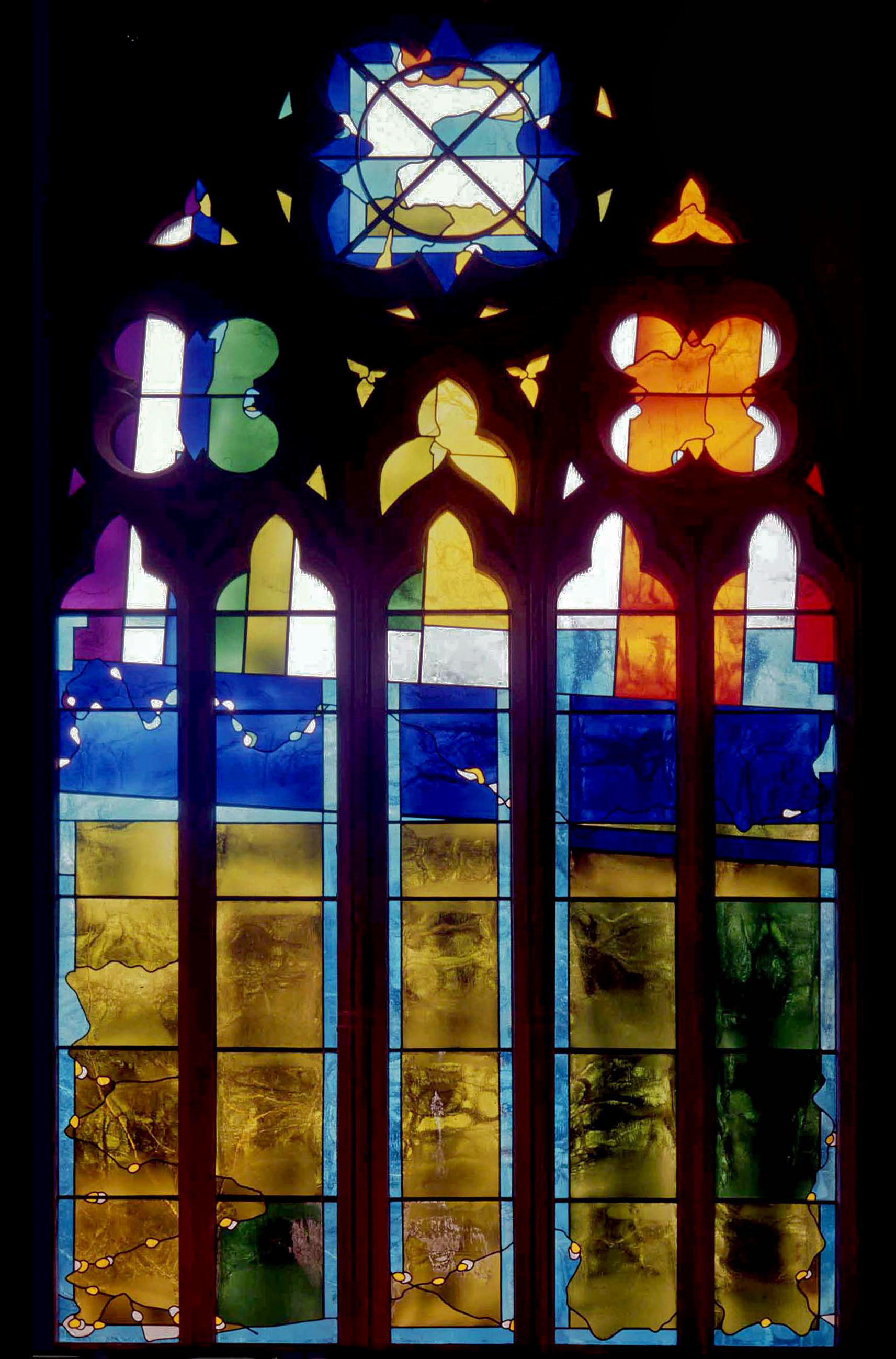
The East window of All Saints Church, Habergham, 1976

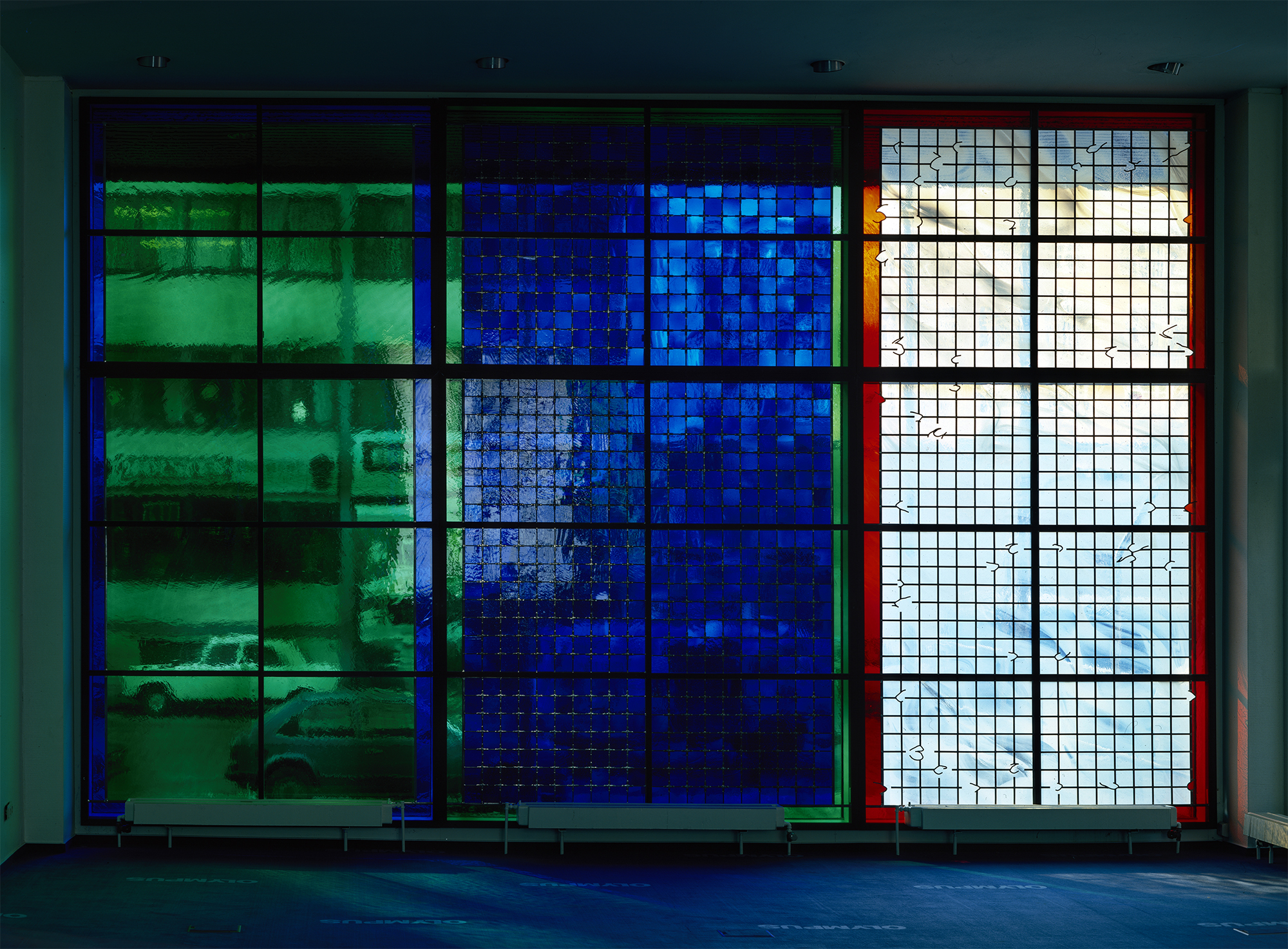
Stained glass of Olympus Optical Headquarters Hamburg, 1981

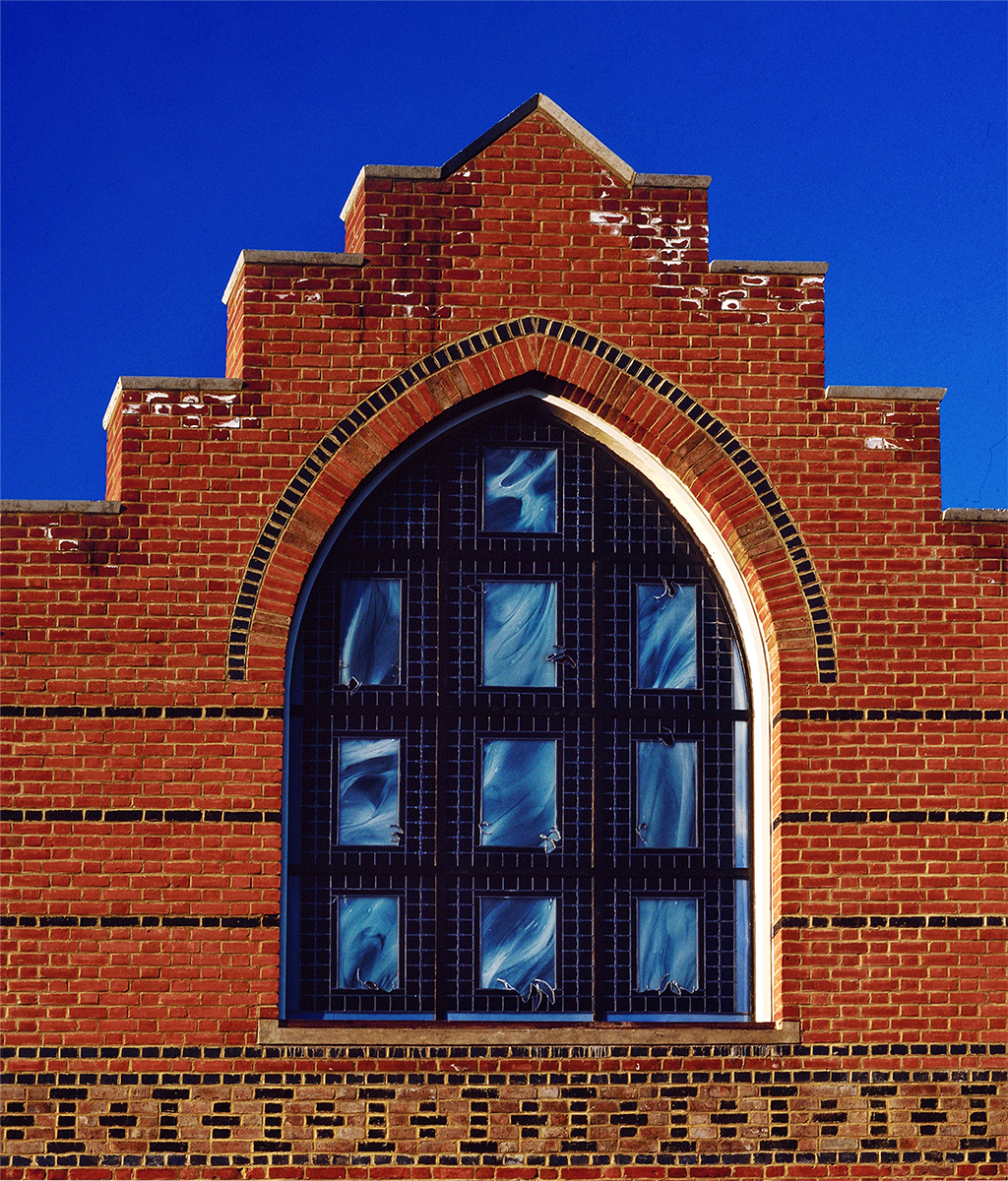
Stained glass window for the former Lavers and Barraud Building, Endell Street, 1981

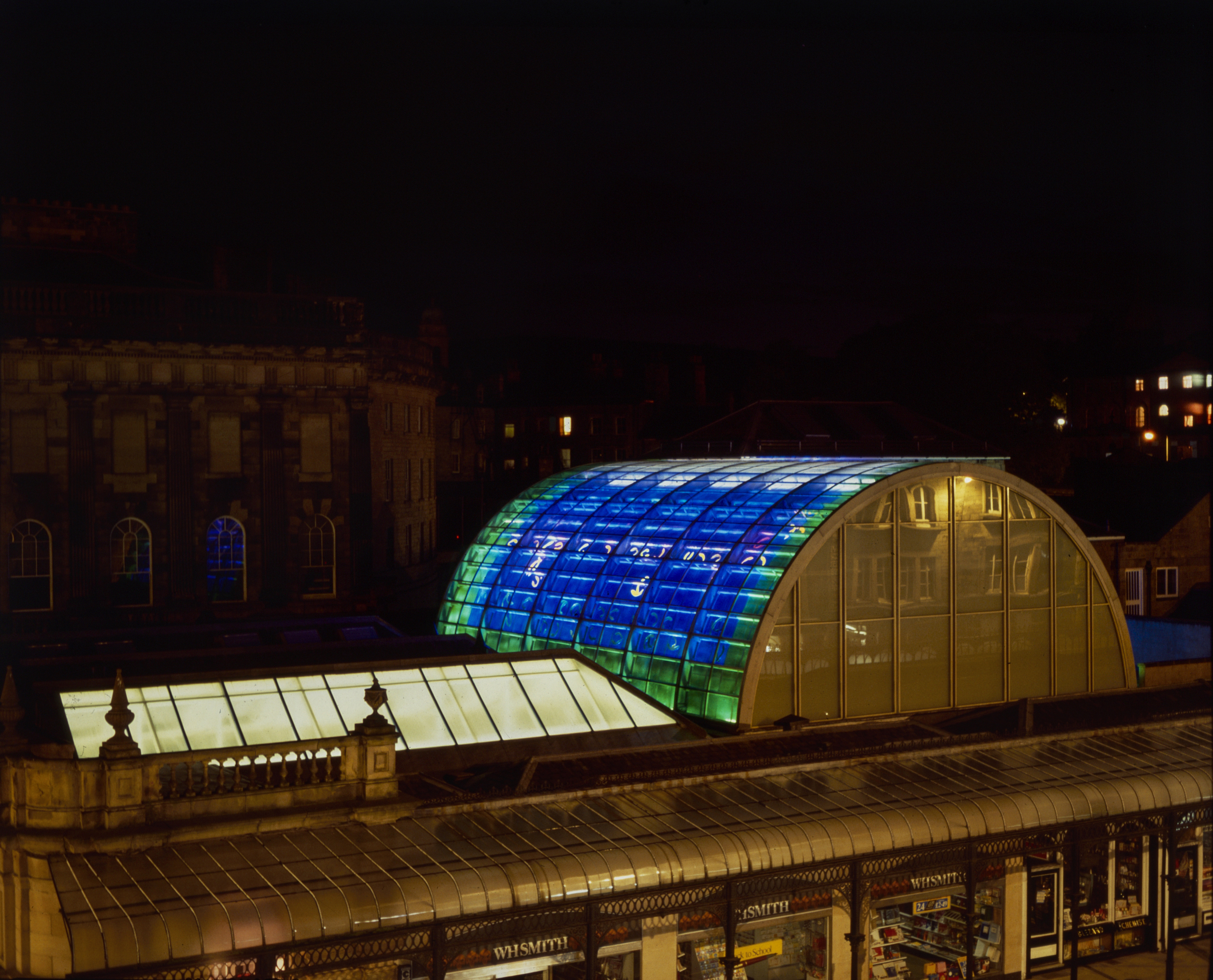
Nocturnal view of the Cavendish Arcade's stained glass canopy at Buxton Thermal Baths

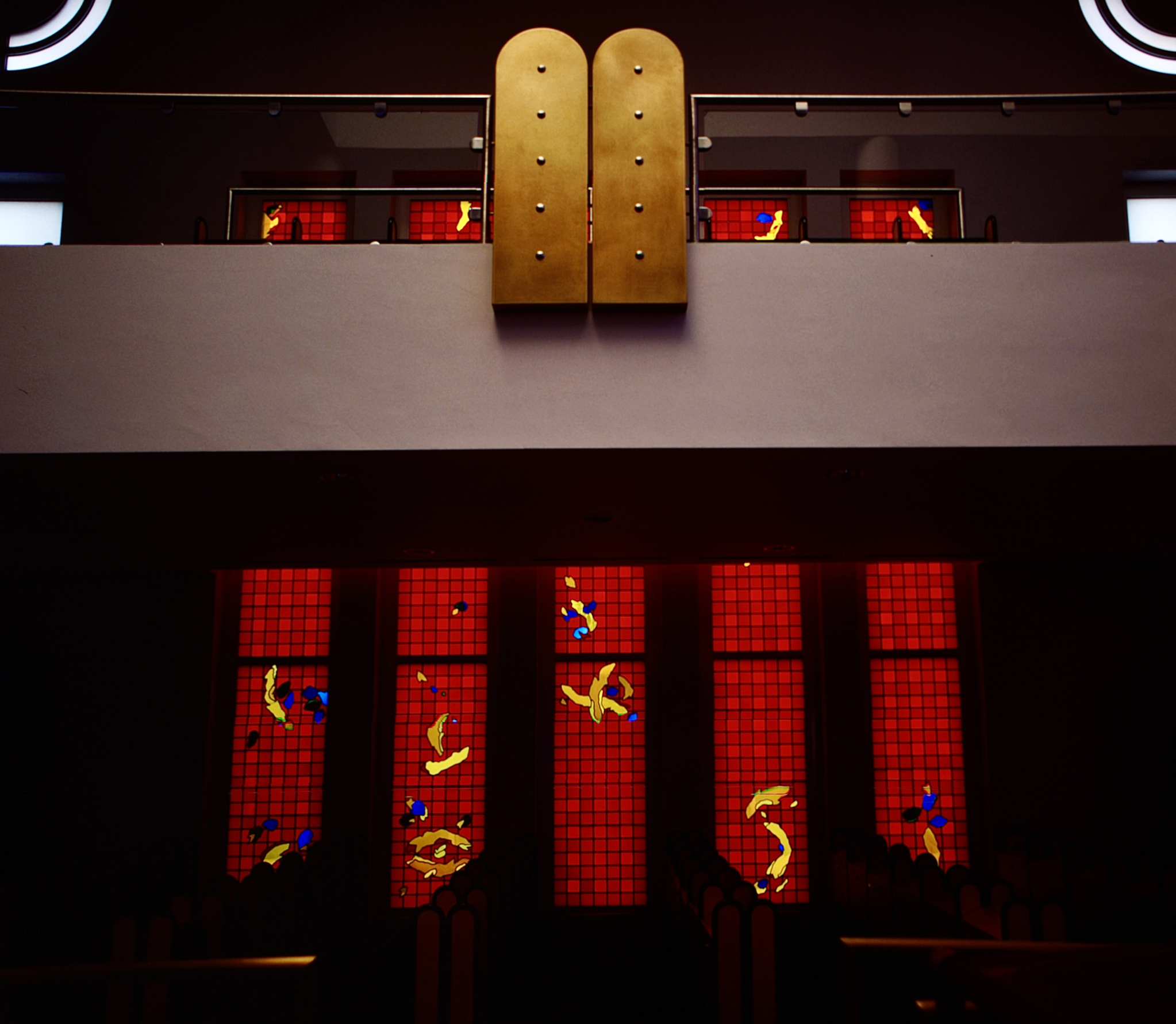
North wall of the New Synagogue, Darmstadt

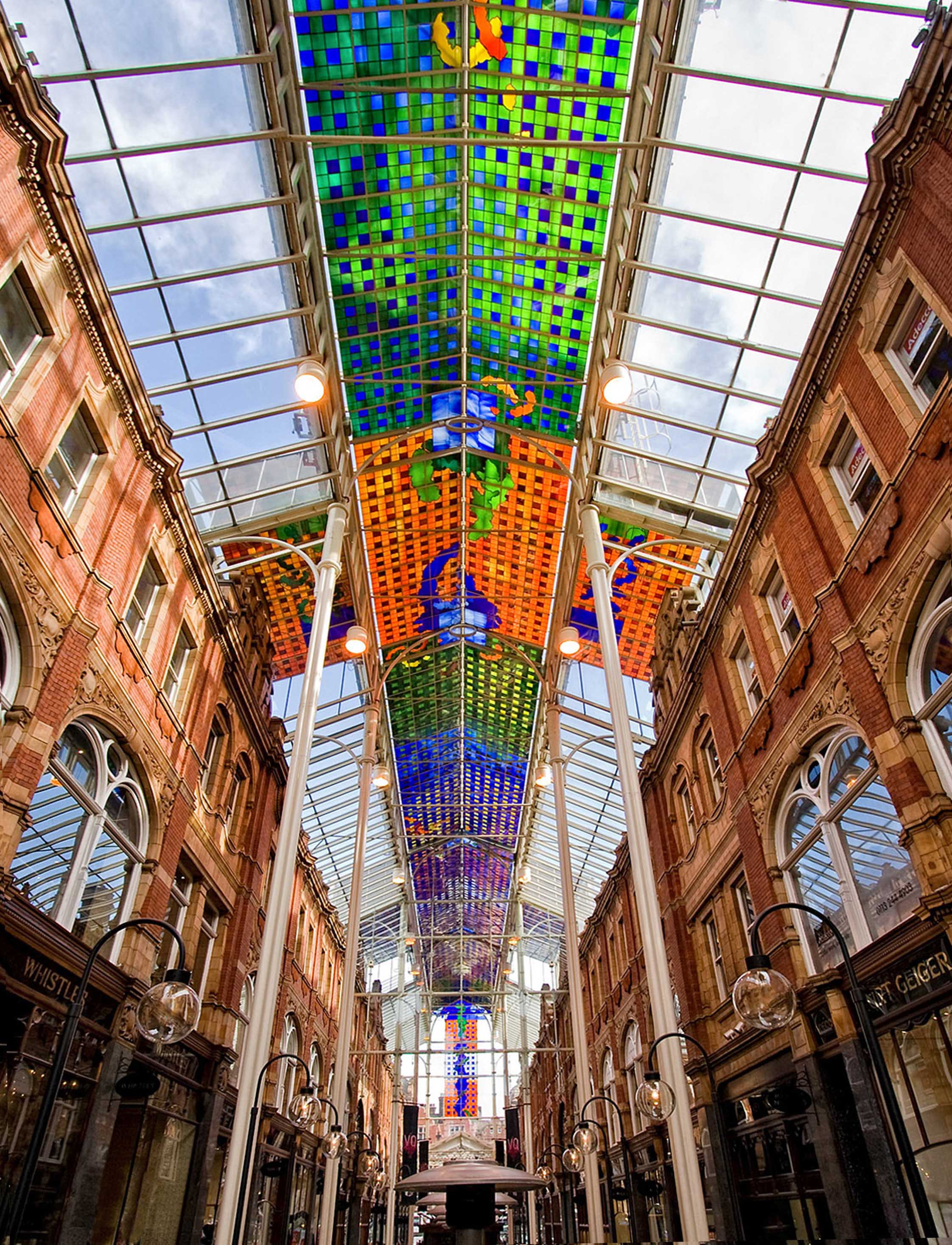
The street-length canopy of Victoria Quarter, Leeds, the largest stained glass work in Great Britain

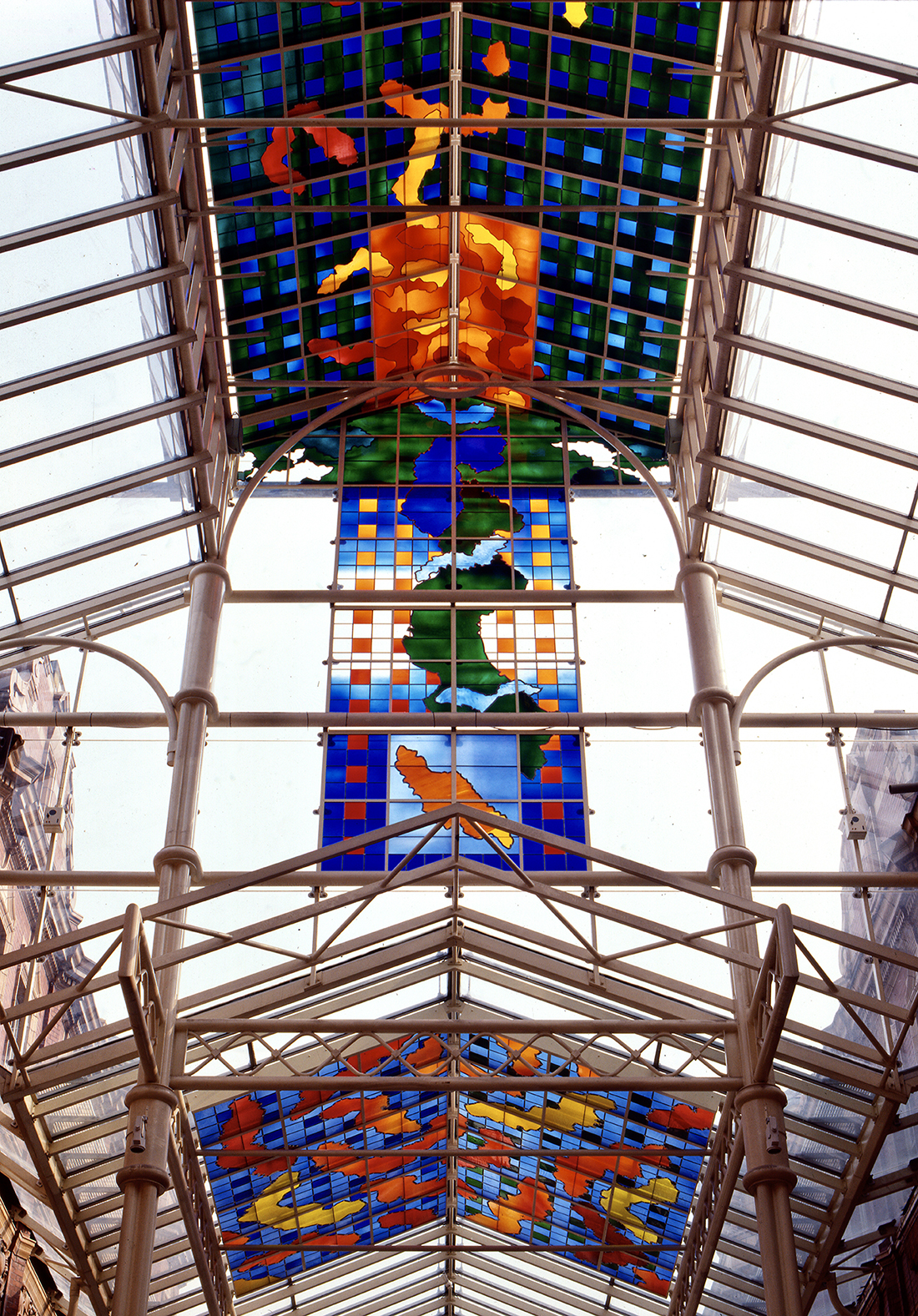
Victoria Quarter

Interior view of Clarke's Stamford Cone (1999), a 14m high stained glass sculpture for the headquarters of UBS

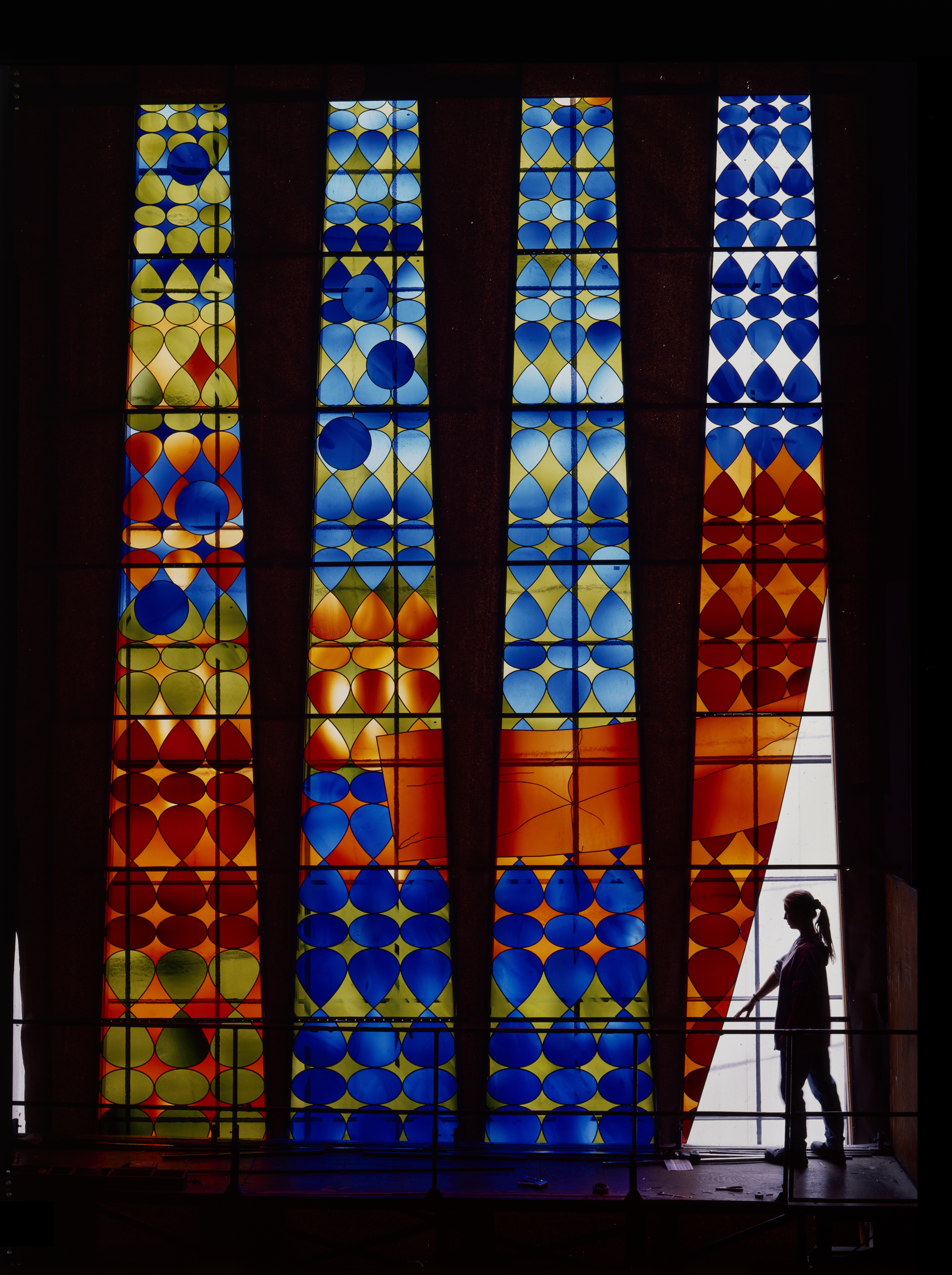
The Stamford Cone, formerly the largest freestanding glass structure ever made, during fabrication

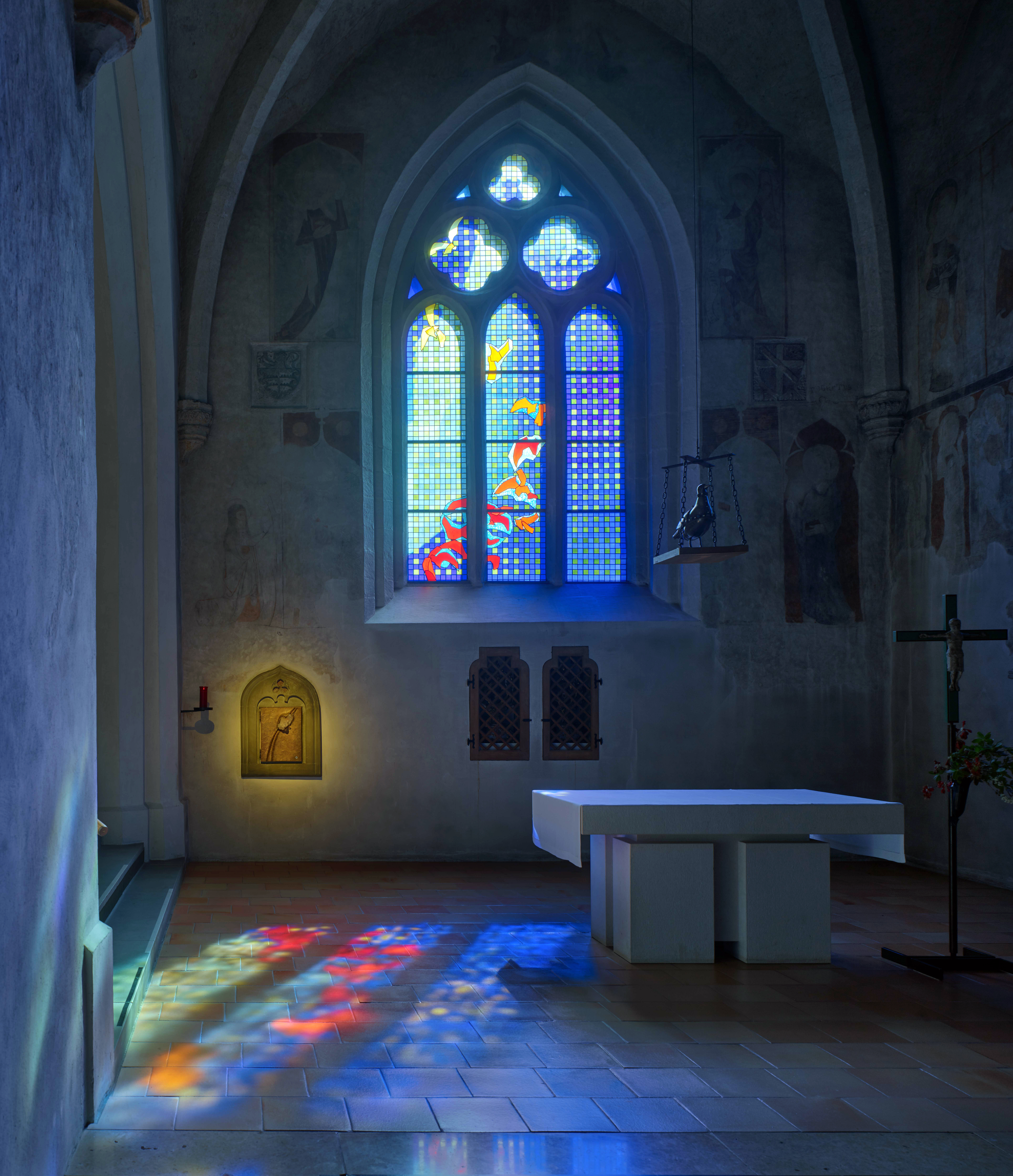
Stained glass window by Clarke for the 12th-century Cistercian Abbaye de la Fille-Dieu, Romont (1996)

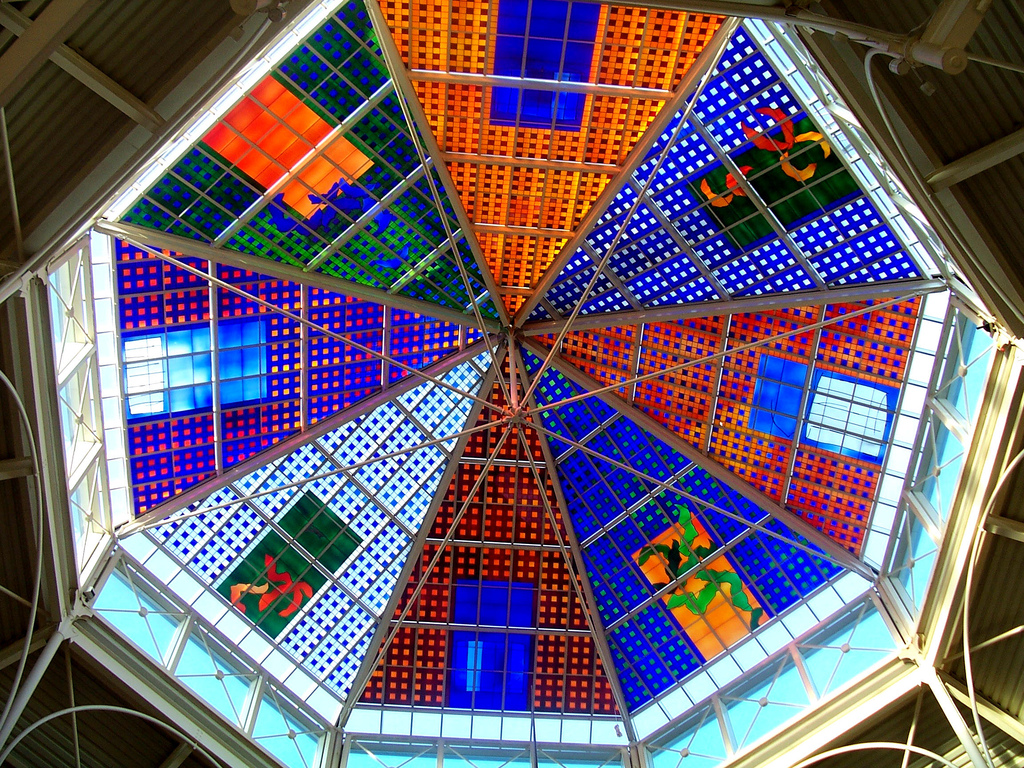
The Spindles by Brian Clarke in his home town of Oldham, celebrating the music of Sir William Walton

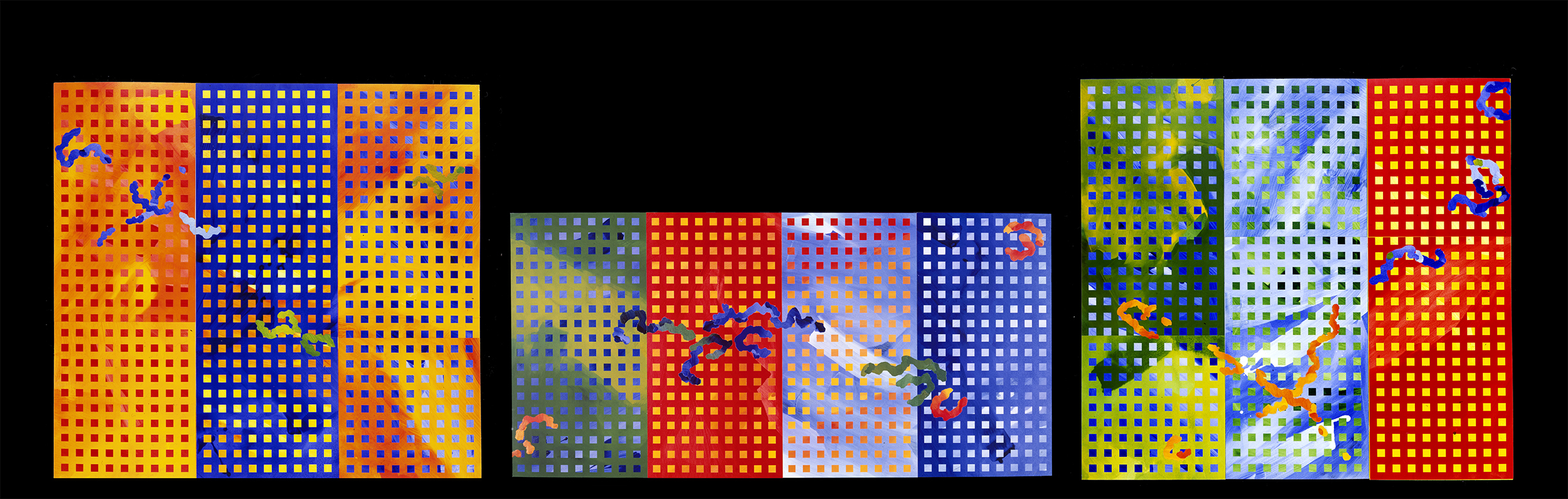
Clarke's painted stadia and arena set designs for Paul McCartney's 1989-1990 World Tour
