= Westminster Coroner's Court =

Coroner's court for the City of Westminster, Greater London

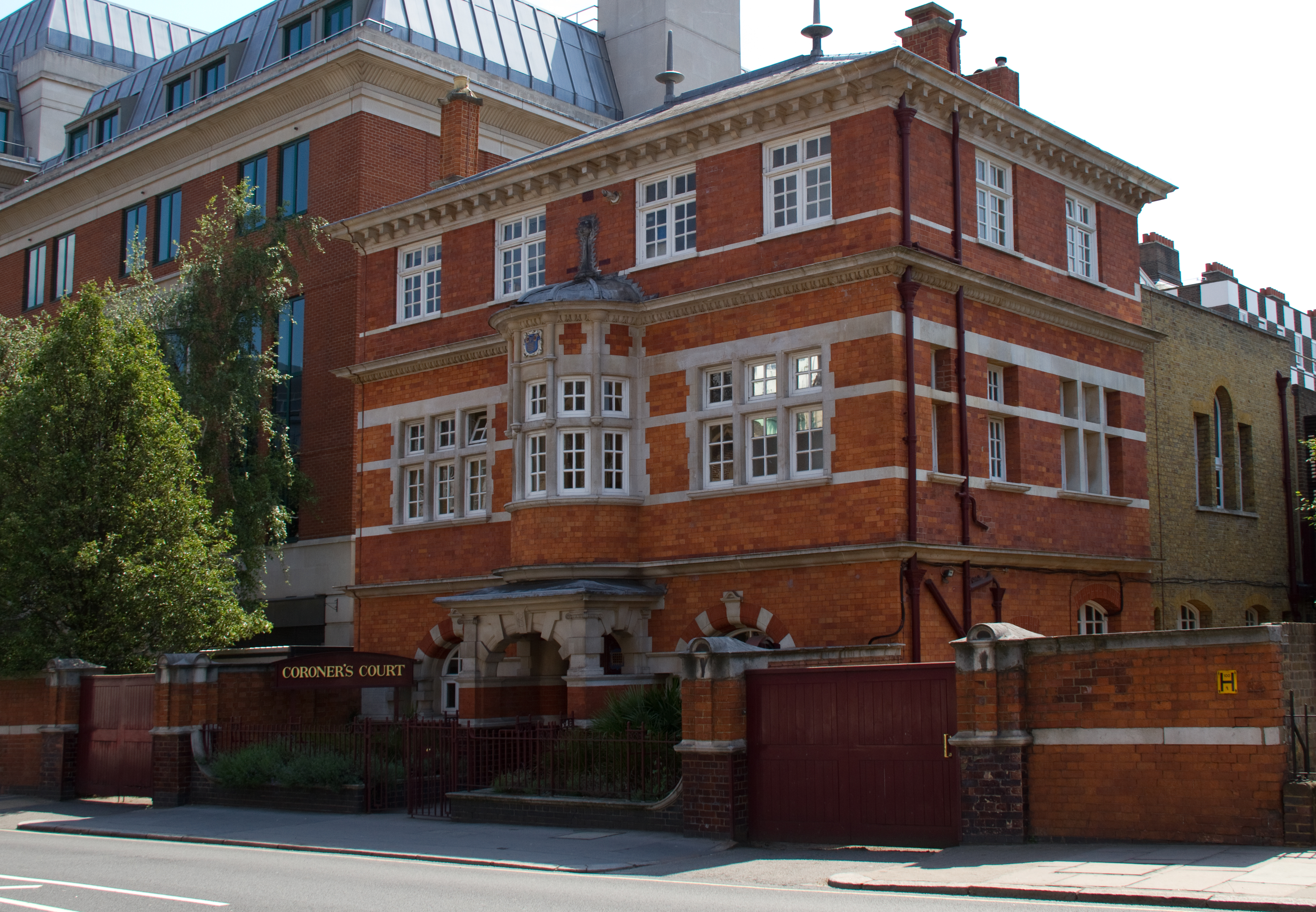
- Westminster Coroner's Court
- Interactive map of the Westminster Coroner's Court area
- Alternative names: Inner West London Coroner's Court

General information
- Architectural style: Arts and Crafts
- Location: 65 Horseferry Road, Westminster, London SW1P 2ED
- Coordinates: 51.494768°N 0.131697°W
- Completed: 1893

Design and construction
- Architect: G. R. W. Wheeler

Website

Listed Building – Grade II
- Official name: Coroner's Court, Horseferry Road SW1
- Designated: 14 January 1970
- Reference no.: 1066635
- Shown in Westminster

The Coroner's Court for the City of Westminster, Greater London, is located in Westminster at 65, Horseferry Road, together with the office of HM Coroner, and is a Grade II listed building.

The Court covers part of the Inner West London coroner area, together with the Inner West London Coroner's Court, which is located on Tachbrook Street; there are four London boroughs within its coronial jurisdiction, as it serves Westminster and the Boroughs of Kensington and Chelsea, Wandsworth, and Merton. HM Senior Coroner for the Coronial Area of Inner West London fulfils the duties of that office from both locations.

An extension to the building, designed by Patrick Lynch, was opened in 2024, containing a jury room, offices, and a waiting room for families, incorporating stained glass windows by artist Sir Brian Clarke. The Guardian's architecture critic Rowan Moore described the extension as "delivered with both palpable wholehearted good intent and high levels of skill and subtlety."
