= New Synagogue (Darmstadt) =

Synagogue and museum in Darmstadt

- German: Neue Synagoge
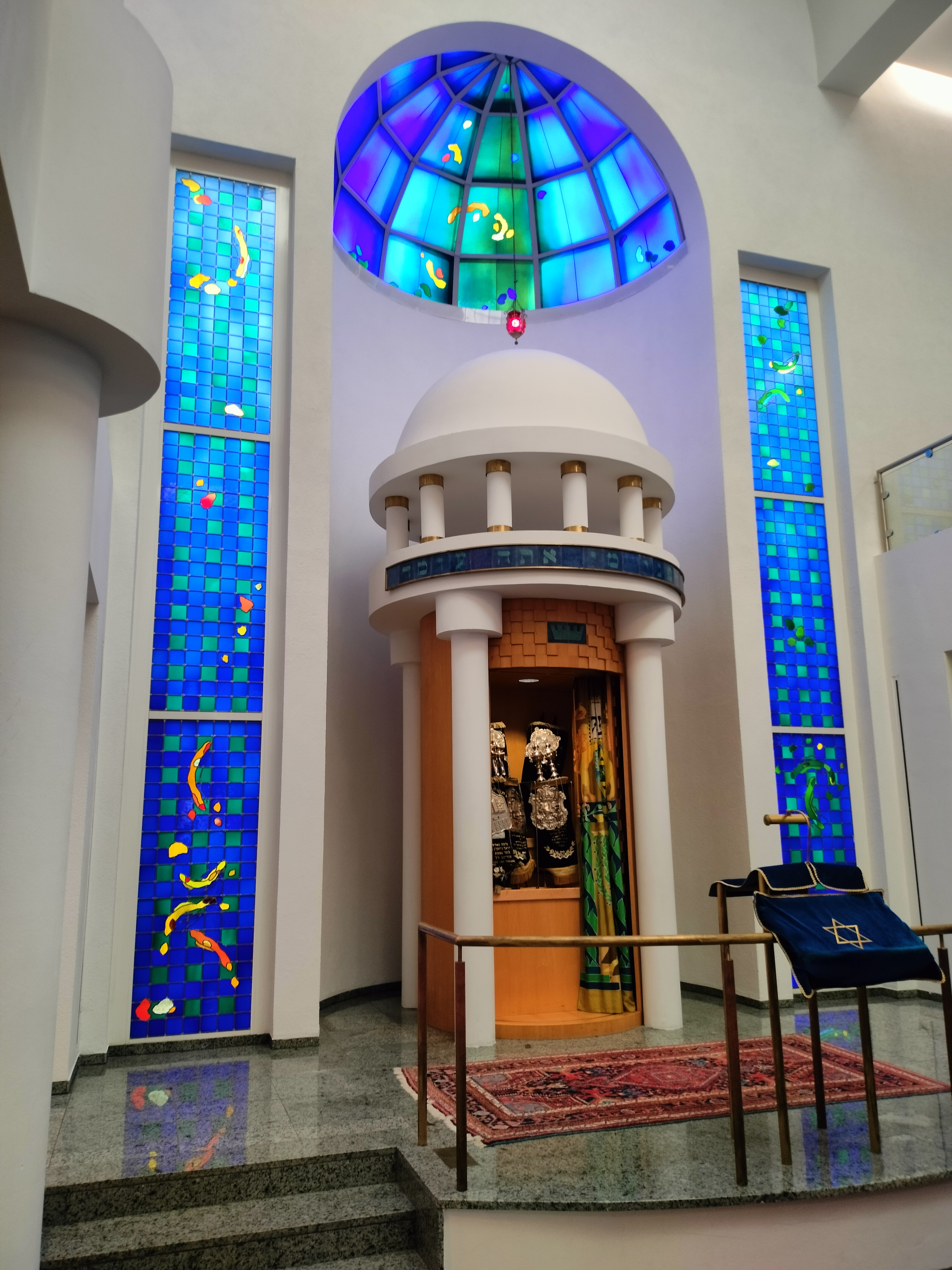
- The Torah ark, stained glass windows and synagogue dome

- Location of the synagogue in Hessen

Religion
- Affiliation: Orthodox Judaism
- Rite: Nusach Ashkenaz
- Ecclesiastical or organizational status: Synagogue
- Status: Active
- Design features: Stained-glass windows by Brian Clarke

Location
- Location: Wilhelm-Glässing-Straße 26, Darmstadt, Hessen
- Country: Germany
- Interactive map of New Synagogue
- Coordinates: 49°52′03″N 8°39′17″E

Architecture
- Architect: Alfred Jacoby
- Type: Synagogue architecture
- Style: Postmodern
- Completed: 1988

Specifications
- Capacity: 200 worshippers
- Dome: Three
- Materials: Stone; concrete

Website
- jg-darmstadt.de (in German)

The New Synagogue (German: Neue Synagoge) is a Jewish congregation, synagogue, community centre, and Jewish museum (German: Jüdische Gemeinde), located in Darmstadt, in the state of Hessen, Germany.

== History ==
Inaugurated on in 1988, the synagogue was built as part of a citizens’ initiative to commemorate the 50th anniversary of Kristallnacht. Known also as the ‘Holocaust Memorial Synagogue’, the architectural complex was designed to fulfil the needs of the city's Jewish population, who had been without a place of worship since the 1938 pogrom when Darmstadt's three synagogues were destroyed. The religious and cultural complex is located on the site of the city's former Gestapo headquarters.

The cultural complex is the site of the local museum of Jewish history and culture, Museum der Jüdischen Gemeinde Darmstadt.

The synagogue is egalitarian and has a number of members who are LGBTQ Jews, converts, or who are in interfaith marriages. Under the leadership of Rabbi Gesa Ederberg, the synagogue's mechitza was removed.

== Architecture ==
The building was designed by Alfred Jacoby in the Postmodernist style, and features stained glass windows designed by British architectural artist Brian Clarke. Clarke designed five windows on the north and south walls respectively, two windows flanking the Torah shrine on the east wall, and a glass dome above the shrine. The colour scheme carries a symbolic meaning: blue on the south side represented hope; red on the north, suffering; and green on the east, a balancing forces.

The first "newly constructed synagogue in the postwar period to recall the traditional form of a central, domed building", the design marked the start of Jacoby's development of a distinct modern Jewish religious architectural vernacular.

== Gallery ==
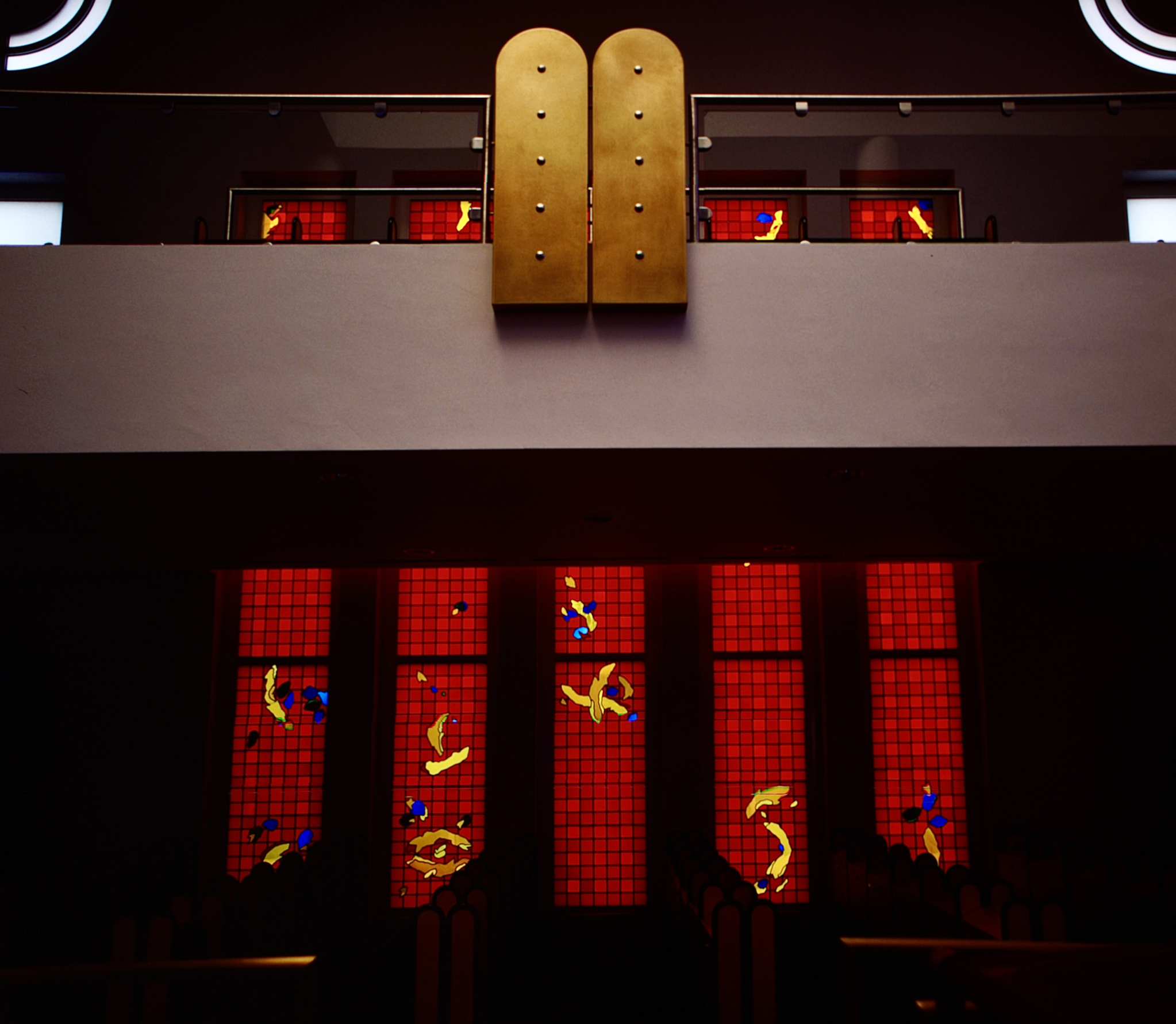
The north wall of the New Synagogue, with stained glass by Brian Clarke

== See also ==
- History of the Jews in Germany
- List of synagogues in Germany (in German)
