= Stamford Cone =

Landmark stained glass sculpture in Connecticut

- The Swiss Bank Cone, UBS Cone
- Interior view of the Stamford Cone
- Artist: Brian Clarke
- Year: 1996–1999
- Medium: Stained glass
- Location: Stamford
- Coordinates: 41.048°N 73.5426°W
- Owner: UBS AG

The Stamford Cone is a 14-metre-high (46 ft) stained glass pavilion, commissioned from the artist Brian Clarke as a site-specific artwork for the headquarters of UBS AG and landmark feature for the city of Stamford, Connecticut in the United States. Designed and fabricated over three years, it was completed in 1999 at a cost of over $1 million. The realisation of the design was executed jointly by Clarke, architects Skidmore, Owings & Merrill, and engineered by Goldreich Engineering and Dewhurst MacFarlane & Partners. The work was fabricated under Clarke's supervision in Munich, Germany, by the Mayer'sche Hofkunstanstalt. At the time of its completion, the artwork was the largest free-standing glass structure ever built.

== History ==
In 1996, the British artist Brian Clarke was approached by the Swiss Bank Corporation to design a work of site-specific art for their new headquarters in Connecticut, as part of the City of Stamford's Percent for Art programme. The artwork was to be situated in a landscaped park being laid out adjacent to the headquarters complex, now named Gateway Commons. The following year, SBC Warburg was merged with U.S. investment bank Dillon, Read & Co. to create Warburg Dillon Read, and at the time of the work's completion, following the merger of the Swiss Bank Corporation and Union Bank of Switzerland, was operating as UBS Warburg. The Stamford Cone was formally dedicated on 3 June 1999.

== Design and fabrication ==
The resolved work of art takes the form of a conical structure formed entirely of glass, and was designed and fabricated by Clarke, over a period of three years. The composition consists of 204 individual panels of mouth-blown glass laminated to a skin of protective float that forms the exterior glazing, supported by 16 fins of laminated, toughened glass, with steel ring beams and tension cables the only non-glass elements.

== Location ==
The work is located in Gateway Commons, a landscaped park that runs along Washington Boulevard adjacent to the former UBS Dillon Warburg center, created as part of the 1990s regeneration drive for the area that included the commission of the Cone.

== Gallery ==
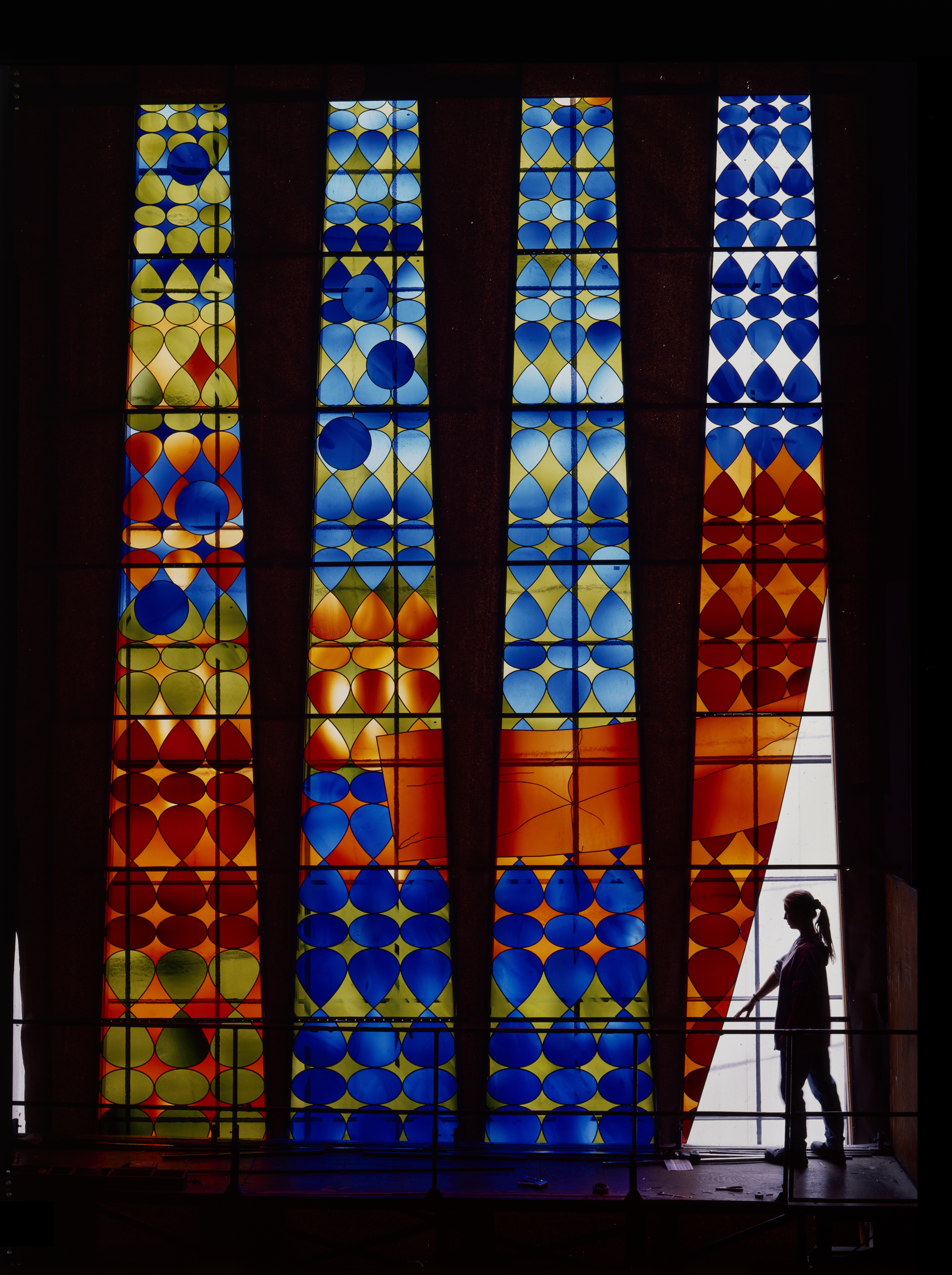
The Stamford Cone during fabrication

Interior view of the Stamford Cone
