= Alfred Jacoby =

German architect (born 1950)

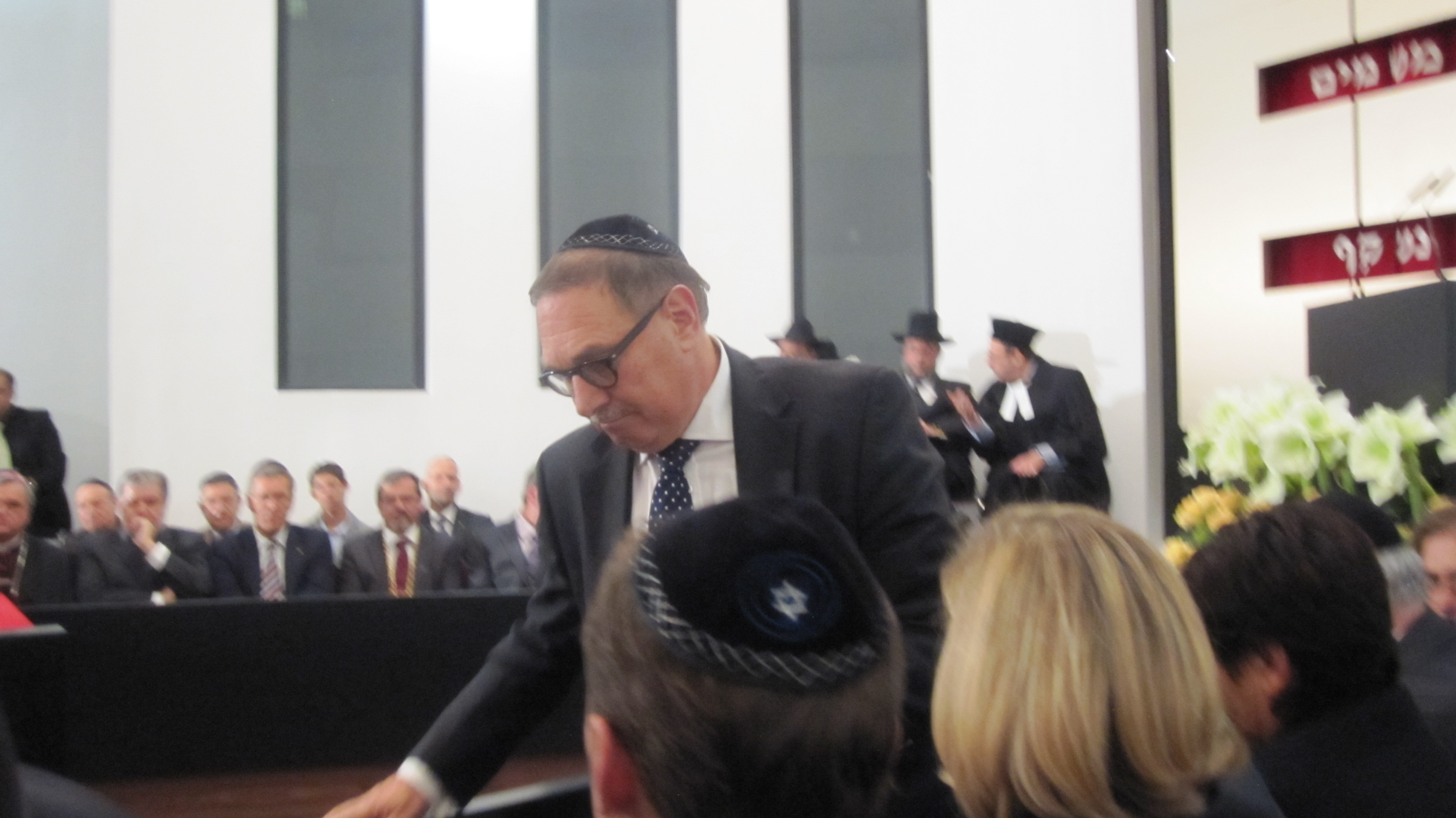
- Jacoby in the Beith-Shalom Synagogue, Speyer, in 2011
- Born: 1950 (age 75–76); Offenbach, Germany
- Occupation: Architect
- Buildings: New Synagogue (Darmstadt), Aachen Synagogue

Alfred Jacoby (born 1950) is a German architect and architectural lecturer, principally known for his output of synagogues in post-war Germany, development of a modern Jewish religious architectural vernacular, his teaching positions as a lecturer and professor of architecture, and his active architectural practice in Frankfurt am Main. Jacoby was born in Offenbach, in 1950, to a Polish father, and was educated at the University of Cambridge and Eidgenössische Technische Hochschule. Credited with being the first postwar architect in Germany to develop a distinctive Jewish vernacular for synagogue buildings, he is recognised as Germany's leading synagogue architect. Jacoby was Director of the Dessau Institute of Architecture at the Anhalt University of Applied Sciences, Bauhaus Dessau, from 2000 until 2017.
