= Leganés =

- Municipality
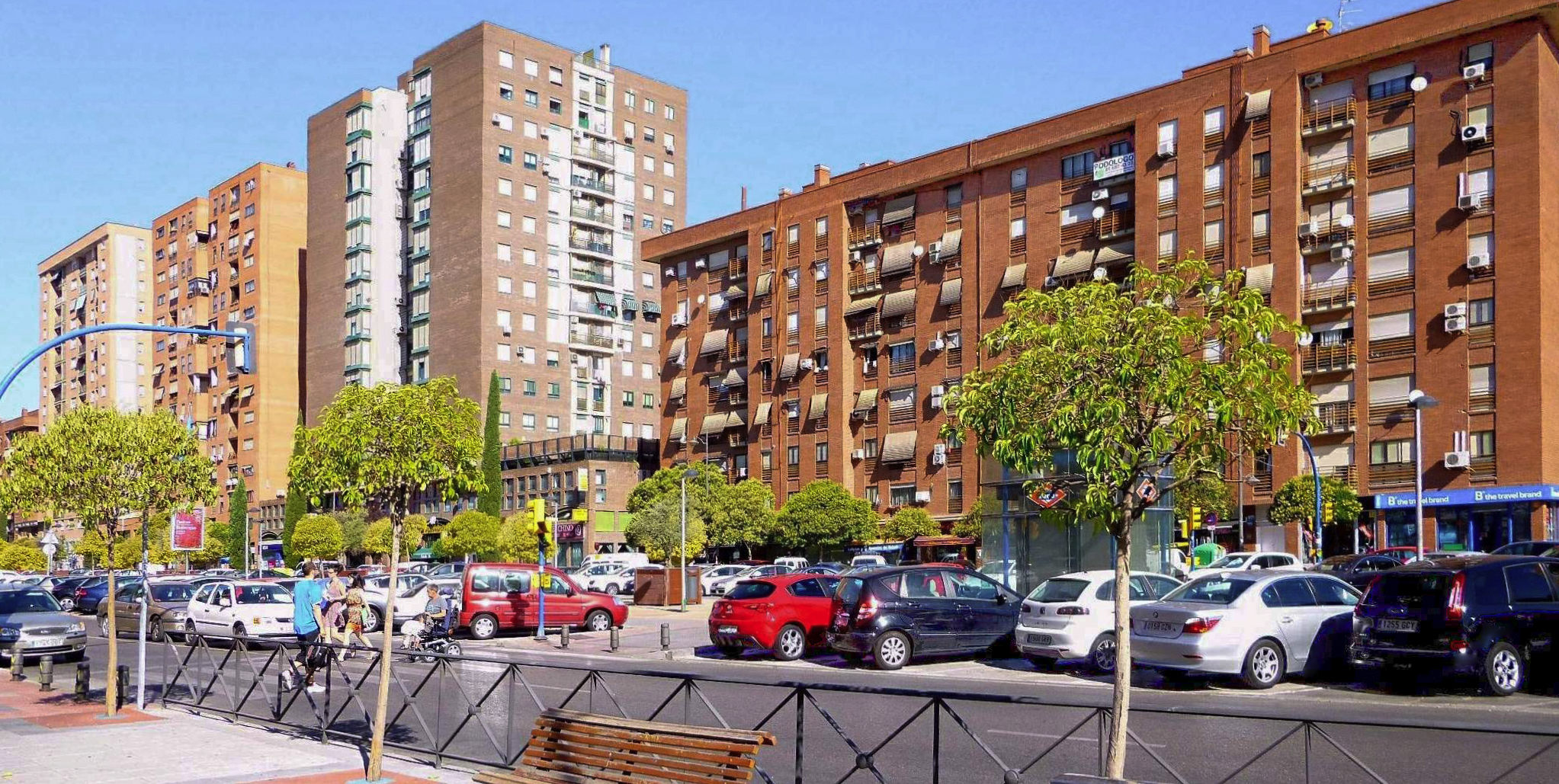
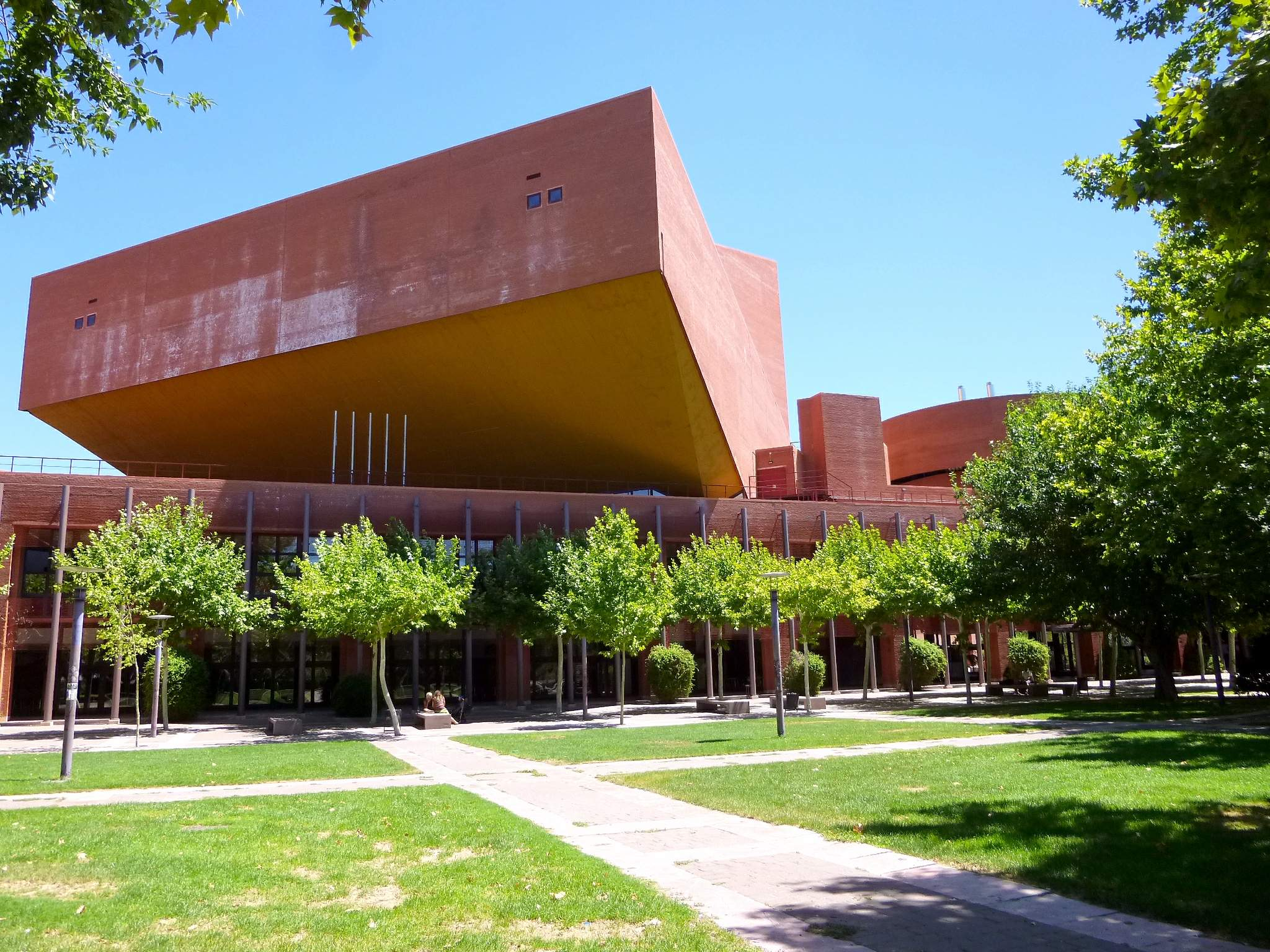
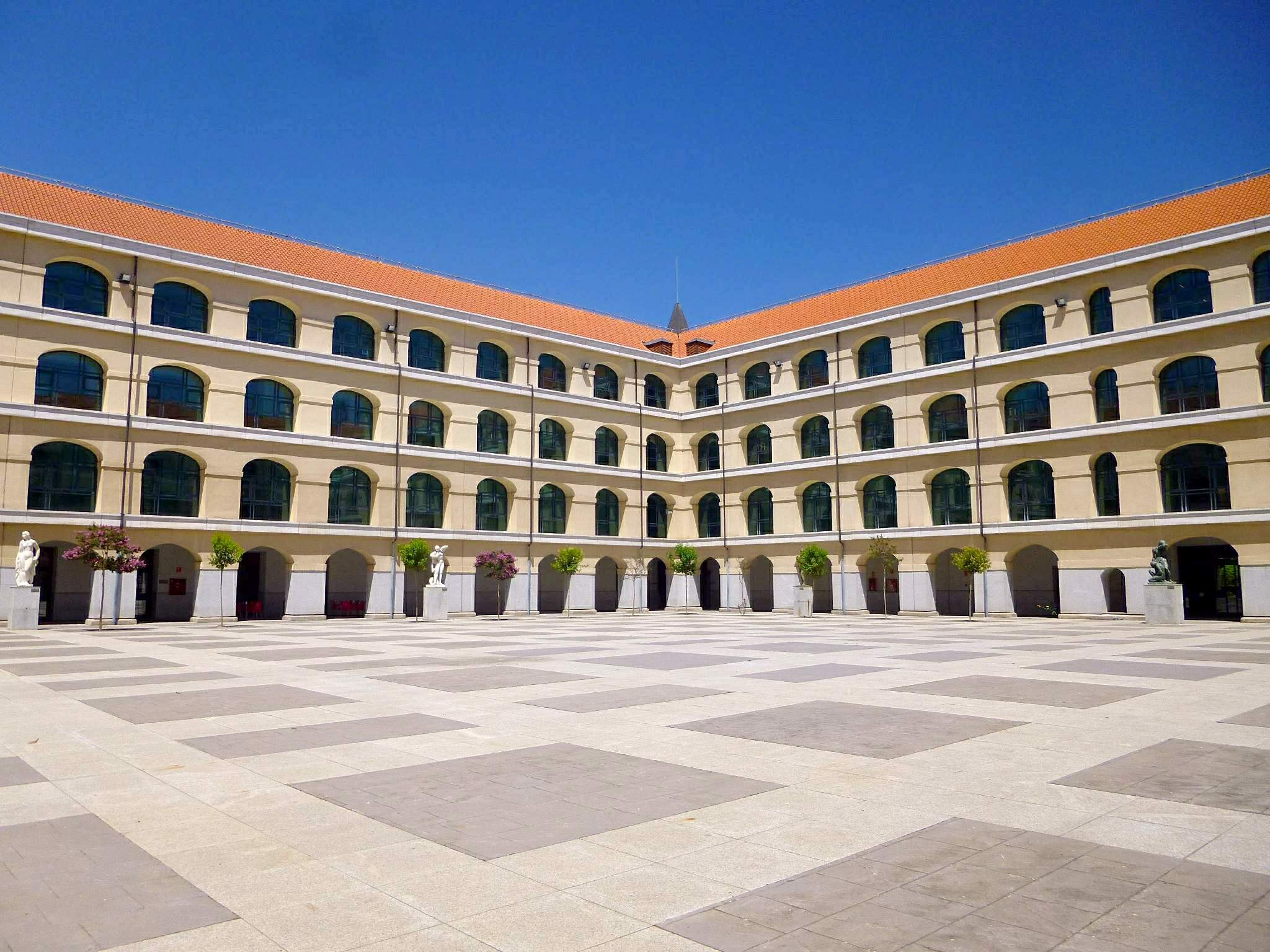
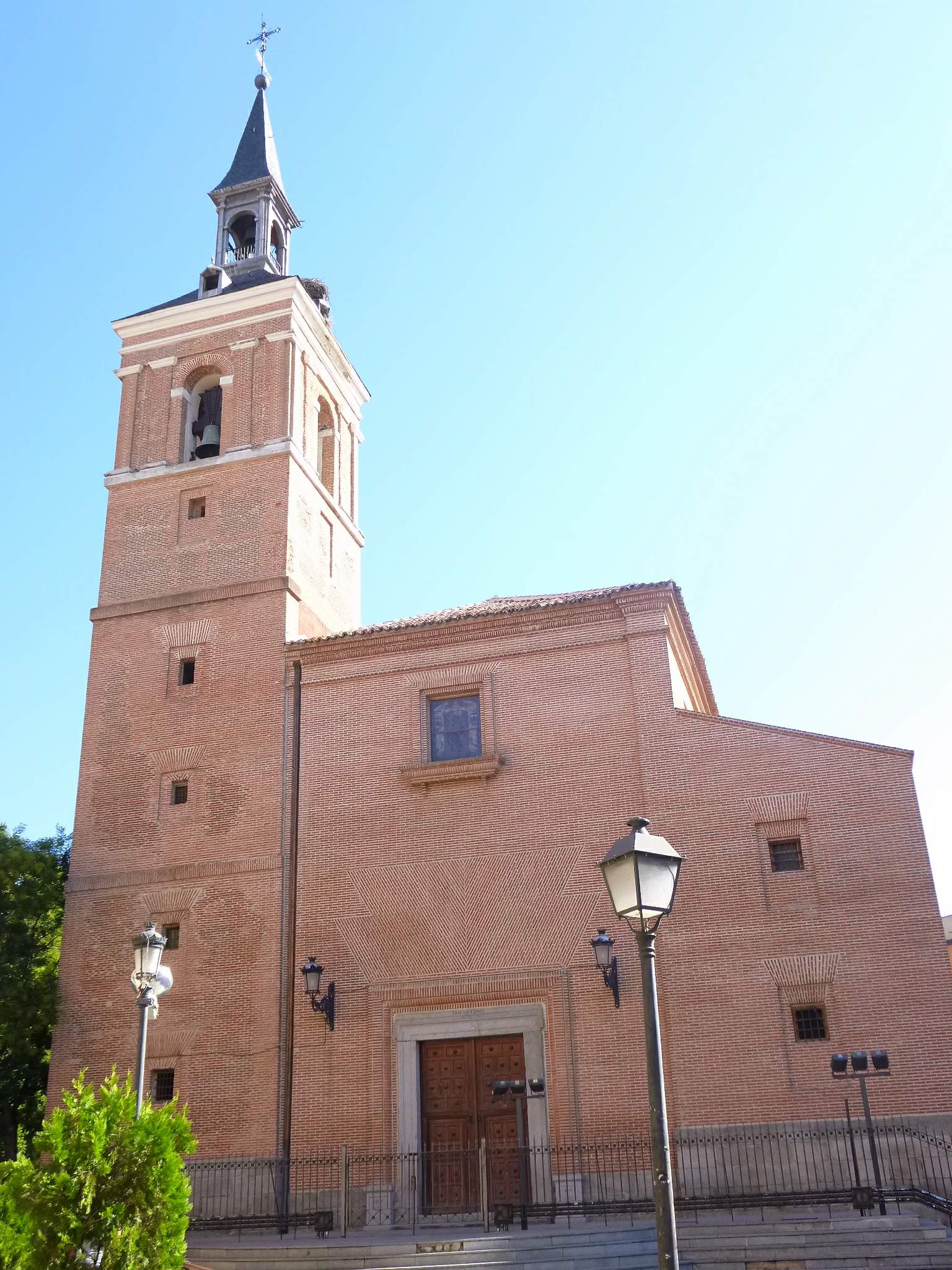
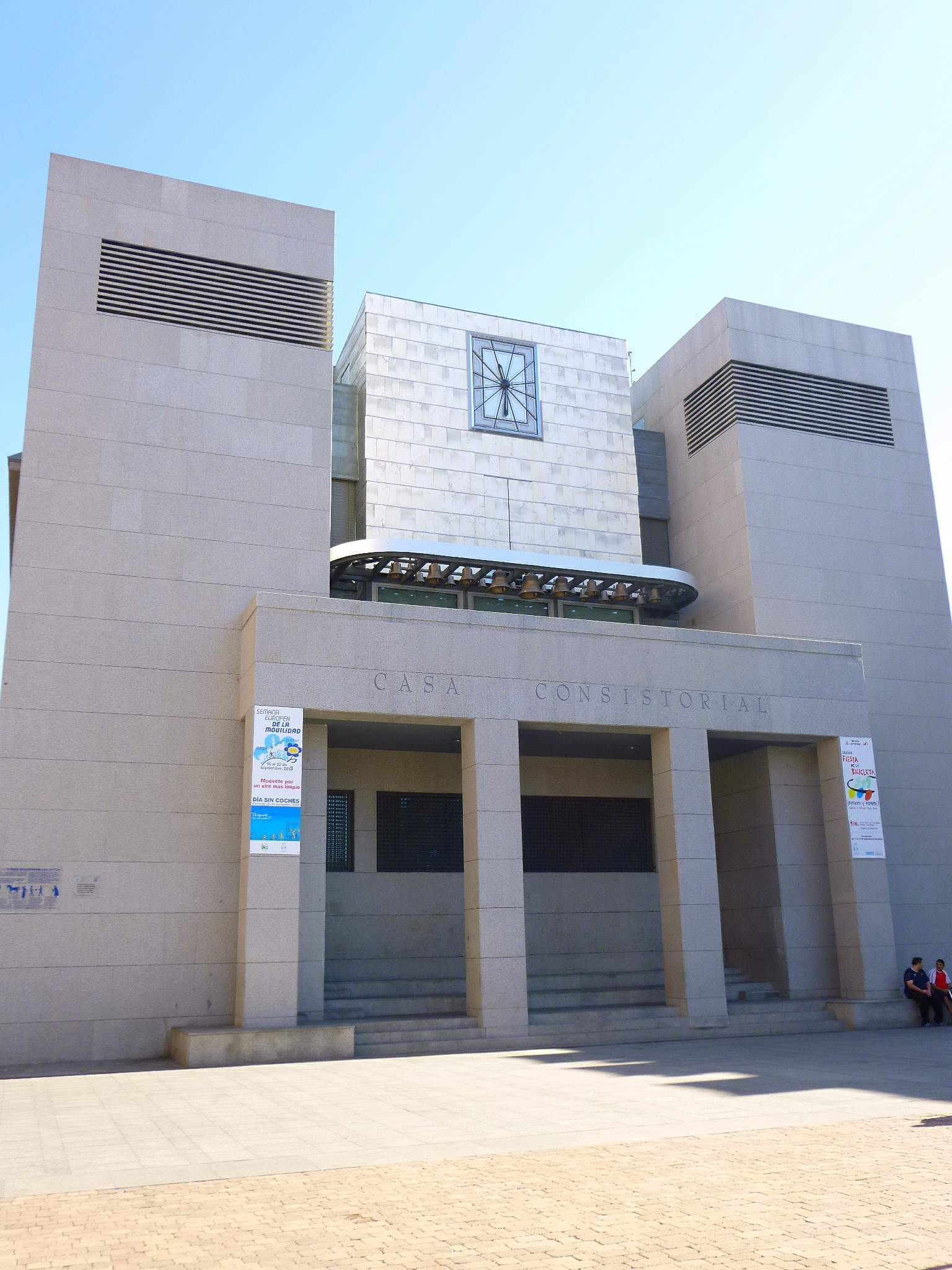
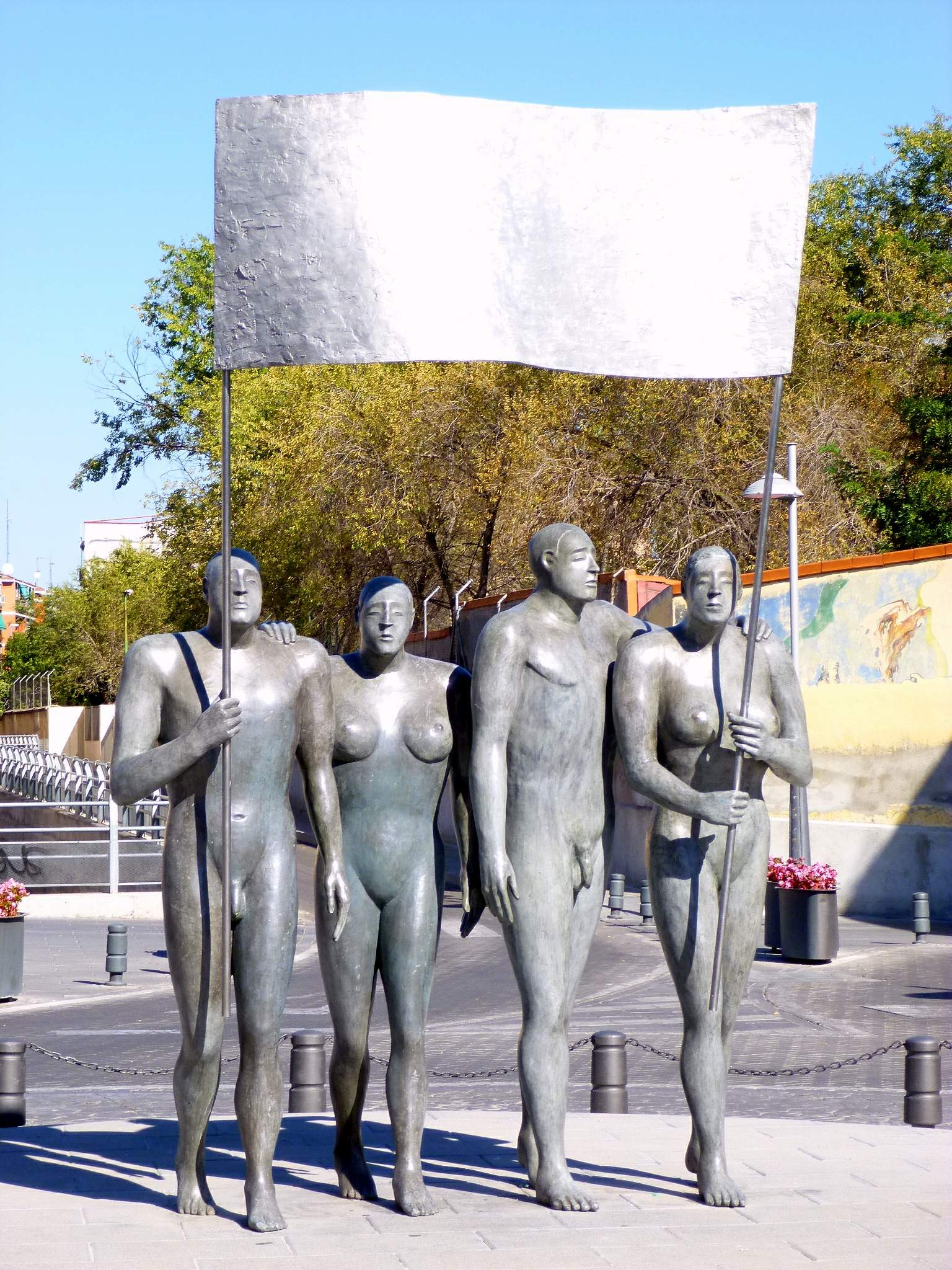
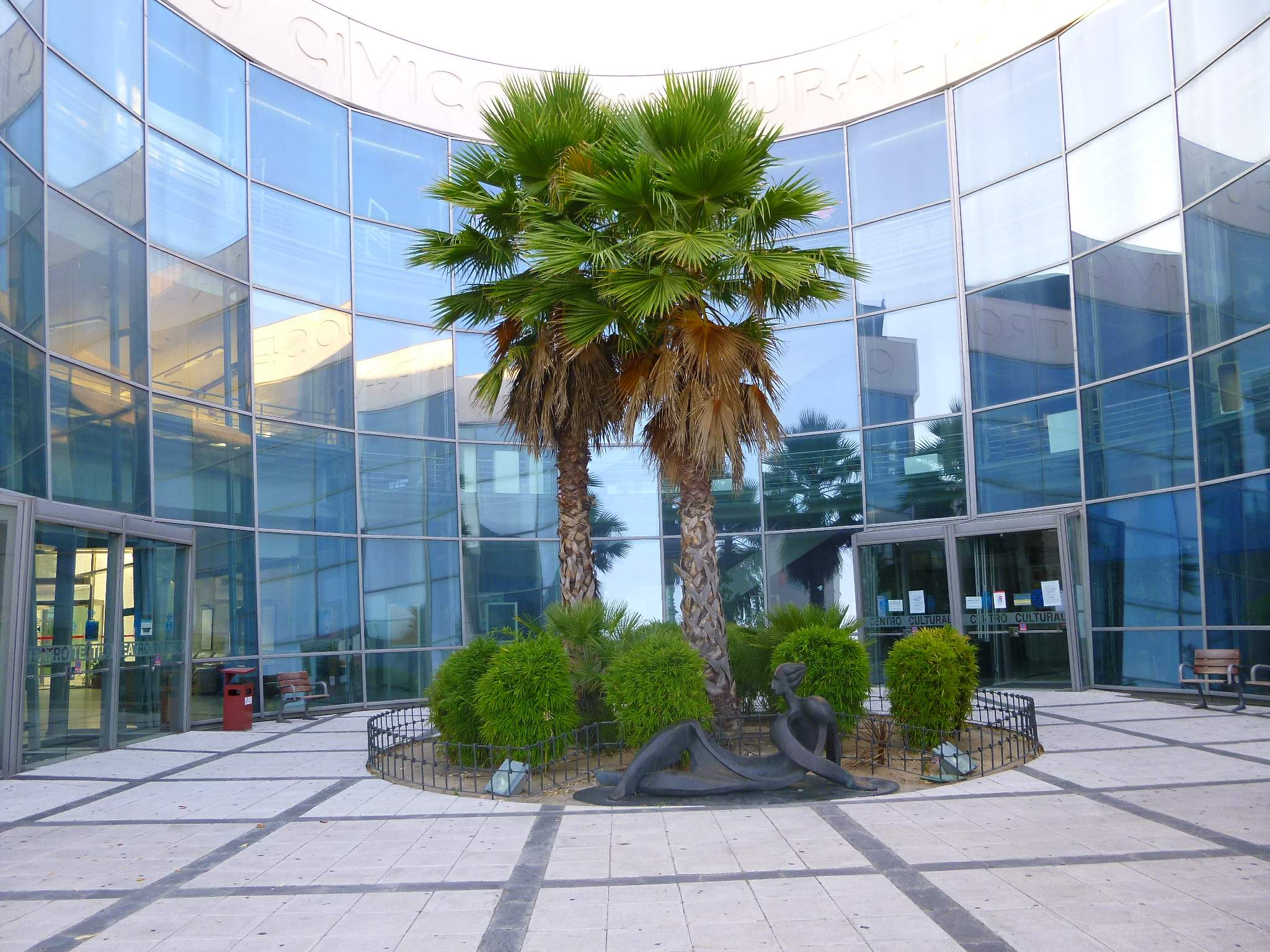
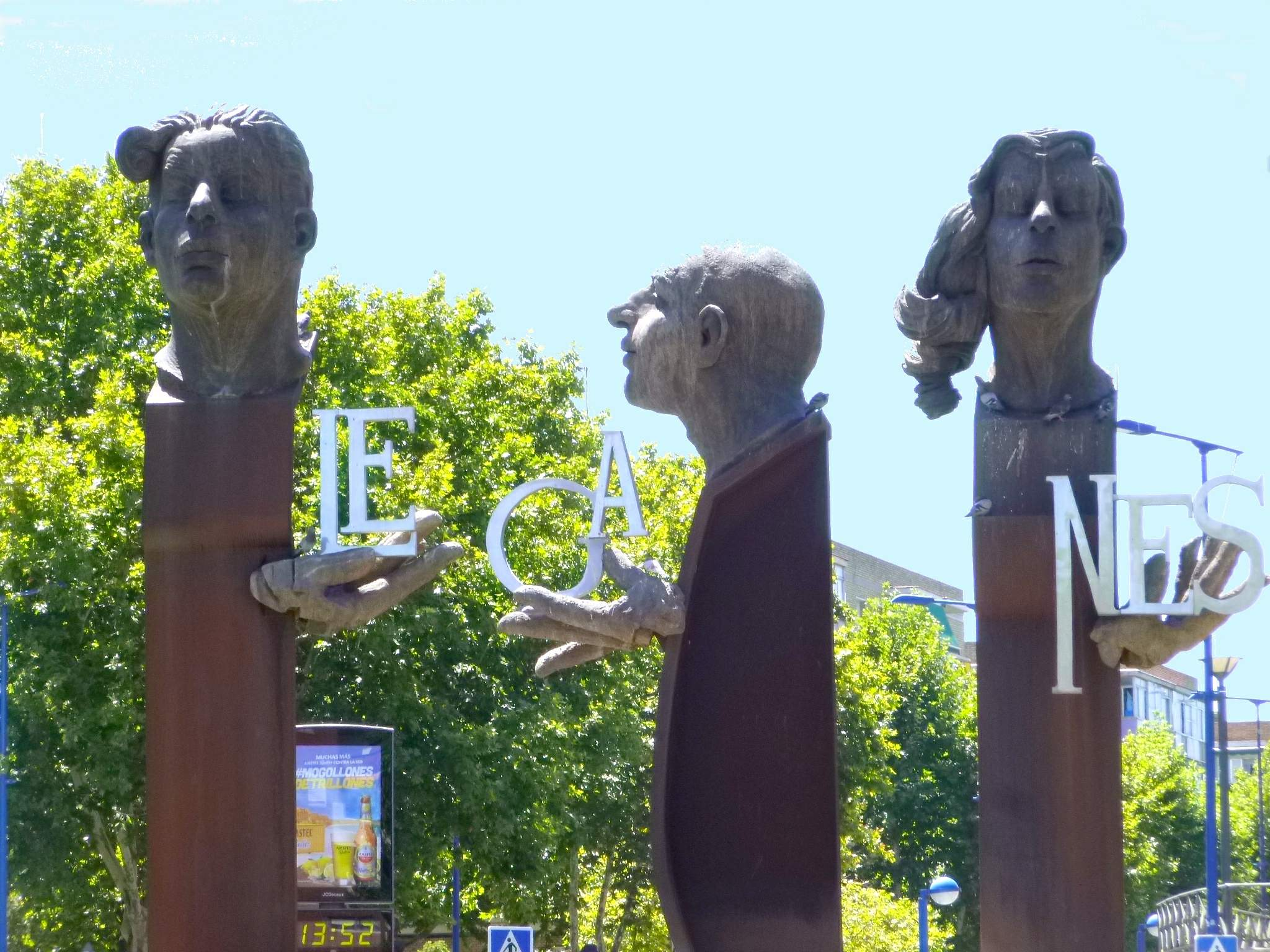

- Flag Coat of arms
- Interactive map of Leganés
- Coordinates: 40°19′41″N 3°45′52″W
- Country: Spain
- Autonomous community: Community of Madrid
- Founded: 1280

Government
  - Type: Ayuntamiento
  - Body: Ayuntamiento de Leganés
  - Mayor: Miguel Ángel Recuenco (PP)

Area
  - Total: 43.25 km^{2} (16.70 sq mi)
- Elevation: 666 m (2,185 ft)

Population (2025)
  - Total: 195,734
  - Rank: 4th in Community of Madrid, 32nd in Spain
- Demonym: Leganense (Note: The informal demonym pepinero is not official but is commonly used by the city's inhabitants and those in surrounding areas)
- Postal code: 28910–28919
- Area code: +34 (Spain) + 91
- Budget: €212,000,000 (2025)
- Website: www.leganes.org

Leganés (Spanish pronunciation: [leɣaˈnes]) is a municipality and a city in Spain, located within the Community of Madrid. It forms part of the Madrid metropolitan area and is situated 11 kilometers southwest of the capital. As of 2025, it has a population of 195,734 inhabitants, it is the fourth most populous municipality in the Community of Madrid and the thirty-second largest in Spain, according to the list of Spanish municipalities by population.

Situated on a plain in the Inner Plateau of the Iberian Peninsula, Leganés is traversed by the Butarque stream, a tributary of the Manzanares River. It borders the Madrid districts of Carabanchel and Latina to the north, Alcorcón to the west, Getafe and the Madrid district of Villaverde to the east, and Fuenlabrada to the south.

Founded in 1280 as "Legamar" during the reign of Alfonso X of Castile, it later adopted its current name and was incorporated as a village into the jurisdiction of Madrid in 1345. In 1627, it became a village under noble jurisdiction when King Philip IV of Spain established the March of Leganés, a status it retained until feudal privileges were abolished in 1820.

During the mid-20th century, like other municipalities near Madrid, Leganés experienced significant population growth due to immigration from other Spanish regions, transforming it into a commuter town where most residents worked in the capital. Over time, Leganés developed its own robust array of public services, industries, and commercial enterprises, becoming a significant contributor to the Community of Madrid.

The city is home to historical landmarks such as the former Santa Isabel Psychiatric Hospital, opened in 1851 as one of Spain's first asylums; the Royal Walloon Guards Barracks, designed by Francesco Sabatini in the 18th century and now part of the Charles III University of Madrid; and ecclesiastical heritage, including the Polvoranca Hermitage and a Baroque altarpiece by José de Churriguera. The municipality also encompasses the Polvoranca Park, one of the largest semi-urban parks in the Community of Madrid.

== Etymology ==
The Relaciones or Descripciones by Francisco Antonio de Lorenzana (1784) provide information about the town's name, which the Leganés City Council has adopted as official. The following excerpt is taken from the updated edition of the Topographic Relations of Philip II, coordinated by Alfredo Alvar Ezquerra:

"In response to the first chapter, they declare that this town is named 'Leganés,' which, according to information from its elders, derives from the fact that at the time of its founding, there was a lagoon in the area where much silt (légamo) accumulated. Initially, it was called 'Legamar,' and from this term, the name Leganés evolved through corruption of the word."

Additionally, historian Ángel Fernández de los Ríos posited that the names "Leganés" and "Leganitos" derive from the Arabic words algannet ('orchards') and alganit ('of the orchards'), respectively.

The official demonym for Leganés is "leganense." However, the colloquial term "pepinero" is also widely used among the population. This term originates from the period when Leganés was an agricultural village supplying vegetables to the capital, with cucumber being the most renowned produce, giving rise to the nickname for its inhabitants. This moniker persists despite the near disappearance of orchards in the city.

== Symbols ==
=== Coat of arms ===

The official coat of arms of Leganés was initially approved on 15 March 1962, though its origins date back to 1895. Over time, it has undergone minor modifications, such as changes to the shape of the crown. Currently, it features a Spanish Royal Crown and two quarters. The first quarter displays the arms of the first Marquis of Leganés, Don Diego Mexía Felípez de Guzmán: two checkered cauldrons, ermines sable, and a bordure composed of Castile and León. The second quarter depicts the lagoon on whose fertile ground the town was established.

The original 1962 version, approved by the Council of Ministers, featured a Marquis's coronet and followed this blazon:

"Divided shield: first, quartered in saltire; first and fourth, azure, a cauldron checkered gules and or, with seven green serpent heads on each handle; second and third, argent, with five sable ermines; bordure composed of Castile and León (Guzmán). Second, azure, a silver lagoon. At the top, a Marquis's coronet."

— Boletín Oficial del Estado No. 77, 30 March 1962

The modified version, which replaced the marquis's coronet with a royal crown, was approved on 8 May 1985. The blazon is as follows:

"Divided shield: 1st, quartered in saltire; first and fourth, azure, with a cauldron checkered gules and or, with seven green serpent heads on each handle; second and third, argent, five sable ermines; bordure composed of castles and lions; second, azure with a silver lagoon. At the top, a royal crown, closed, consisting of a gold circle set with precious stones, composed of eight acanthus leaf fleurons, five visible, interspersed with pearls, converging in an azure orb with a gold meridian and equator, surmounted by a gold cross. The crown is lined with gules."

— Boletín Oficial de la Comunidad de Madrid No. 129, 1 June 1985

=== Flag ===
The flag of Leganés was designed by the town's official chronicler, Juan Antonio Alonso Resalt, at the request of Mayor Fernando Abad Bécquer. It was approved by the Royal Academy of History on 15 March 1985 and has been used since then. The flag features the town's coat of arms in the center, set against a sky blue background. Its design was inspired by the herald depicted in the painting Relief of the Plaza of Lérida in 1646 by Pieter Snayers, housed in the Prado Museum. This herald accompanied the Marquis of Leganés, serving as a reference for the flag's creation. The heraldic description is as follows:

"The flag of Leganés displays, across its entire surface, a turquoise cloth with proportions of three in length to two in width, and in its center is placed the town's coat of arms."

=== Anthem ===
The third symbol of the city is its anthem, composed in 1980 with music by Manuel Rodríguez Sales (founder and former director of the Music School) and lyrics by Pedro Cordero Alvarado.

== History ==
=== Foundation ===
Although Leganés was founded in the 13th century, it is believed that the area was inhabited by all civilizations that have passed through the Iberian Peninsula, given the abundance of water. Archaeological remains from the Upper Paleolithic have been found near Polvoranca, and traces from pre-Roman and Visigothic periods have been discovered along the Butarque stream.

The town was established in 1280 during the reign of Alfonso X of Castile, when residents of the settlements of Butarque and Overa relocated to a new area to escape the foul odors and epidemics caused by nearby lagoons. At that time, it was part of the sexmo of Aravaca. These settlers established themselves near a silt deposit, and the new area was named "Legamar" or "Leganar." Over time, the official name evolved into the current "Leganés."

In 1345, Leganés was incorporated as a village into the jurisdiction of Madrid, under which it remained administratively dependent for nearly three centuries. Being within five leagues of Madrid, it was considered a village of royal demesne. During this period, Leganés, like other areas, operated under a feudal economy with subsistence agriculture.

In 1368, a Leganés resident, Domingo Muñoz, along with two relatives guarding the towers of the Puerta de los Moros, aided Henry II of Castile in his conquest of Madrid by opening the city gates, allowing the Trastámara forces to enter.

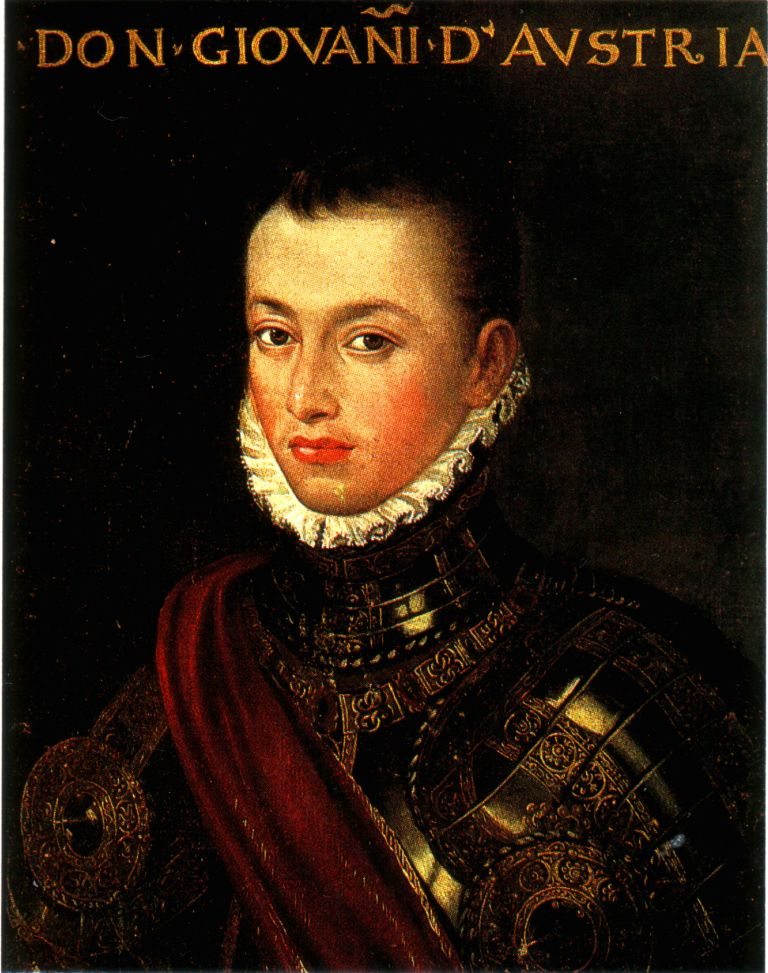
The infante John of Austria lived in Leganés between 1551 and 1554

During the 16th century, several hermitages were constructed, including La Mora (1528), Our Lady of Butarque (1536), and San Cristóbal (1579). A notable event from this period was the arrival of John of Austria, son of King Charles I of Spain, in 1551 at the age of three. His father wished for him to be raised in Spain under the care of Francisco Massy, a court musician, and his wife Ana de Medina, who owned lands in the town. Upon arrival, he was mistaken for Massy's illegitimate son and nicknamed "Jeromín" by the locals. However, in the summer of 1554, he was moved to Villagarcía de Campos (Valladolid) to be educated by Magdalena de Ulloa, wife of the steward Don Luis de Quijada.

=== From village to entailed estate ===
In 1626, Leganés transitioned from a royal demesne village to an entailed estate when it was sold by the Crown to Diego Mexía Felípez de Guzmán, Viscount of Butarque. On 15 March 1627, King Philip IV of Spain issued a Royal Decree granting independence from Madrid, establishing it as a "town under noble jurisdiction" with the creation of the March of Leganés. Diego Mexía thus became the Marquis and Viscount of Butarque.

The town gained its own town council and magistrates. As the lord, the marquis had the sole authority to appoint mayors, administer justice, set taxes, and designate municipal officials. His descendants maintained control for over two centuries until feudal privileges were abolished in 1820. Prominent families, such as the Medinaceli and Tamames, established residences there, often as summer homes.

Notably, Juan Muñoz, a noble from an influential local family, died in 1623 and bequeathed part of his fortune to establish a hospital for the poor of Leganés and Villaverde. Today, the main street in the old town and a community center bear his name.

In the 18th century, significant additions to the local heritage were made. In 1700, the San Salvador Church, the city's most important, was inaugurated after thirty years of construction. Its Baroque main altarpiece, completed in 1720, was crafted by José de Churriguera, and the parish organ was designed by José de Verdalonga. In 1775, King Charles III of Spain commissioned architect Francesco Sabatini to build the Royal Walloon Guards Barracks, inaugurated in 1783. Today, this barracks has been renovated and serves as part of the Charles III University of Madrid.

Leganés was not unaffected by the Spanish War of Independence. Between 1808 and 1812, the Walloon Guards Barracks were occupied by Napoleonic troops. In the courtyard, brothers Leandro and Julián Rejón, two farmers accused of participating in the Dos de Mayo Uprising, were executed by firing squad.

=== Modernization ===
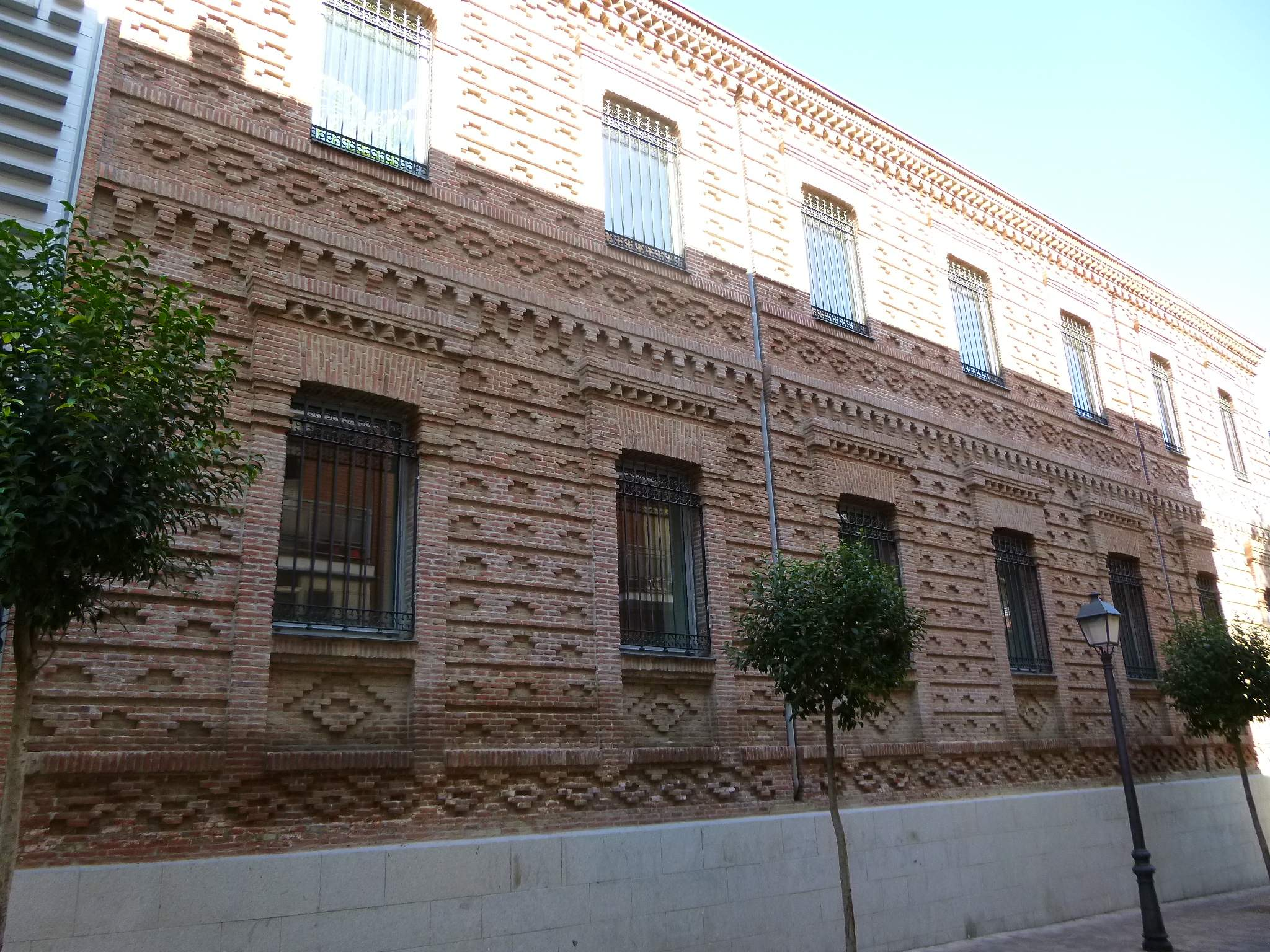
The Santa Isabel Psychiatric Hospital, opened in 1851, spurred the town's development

The abolition of feudal privileges in 1820 for the marquesses of Leganés led to the disentailment of the town and the waters of the Butarque stream. These measures necessitated modernization and population growth, absorbing the entire population of Polvoranca, a village that disappeared in the 1840s due to poor living conditions. Its lands now form part of the current Polvoranca Park.

The most significant catalyst for development was the opening of the Santa Isabel Psychiatric Hospital on 28 December 1851, built in the Neo-Mudéjar style on the former Tamames family estate. Considered Spain's first asylum, it admitted its initial 44 patients on 24 April 1852 under the direction of neurologist Luis Simarro. The hospital's presence spurred essential infrastructure improvements, including street paving, sewer systems, and electric lighting.

Leganés was also the site of Spain's last legal duel, known as the Carabanchel duel. On 12 March 1870, in an area near the Dehesa de los Carabancheles (now La Fortuna), the Duke of Montpensier, Antoine of Orléans, faced his cousin Enrique. The former survived.

By the late 19th century, transportation networks improved significantly. Since 1833, Leganés had a regular omnibus line connecting it to the capital in a one-and-a-half-hour journey. The Leganés railway station opened on 20 June 1876 as a stop on the Madrid-Cáceres-Portugal line, fully operational four years later. In 1876, the Madrid-Leganés tram line began, becoming the capital's first steam-powered tram three years later. In 1879, running water was introduced, sourced from the Fuente de la Canaleja (Alcorcón), where the Butarque stream originates.

The economy of Leganés was primarily agricultural until the mid-20th century, specializing in vegetables (especially cucumbers) and aguardiente. The proclamation of the Second Spanish Republic in 1931 led to the rise of the labor movement and the election of Mayor Pedro González "Perucho", one of the municipality's most significant leaders. His tenure saw advancements in public education, the construction of the first town hall, and the provision of basic services to all residents. During the Spanish Civil War, Leganés initially remained loyal to the Republican government for a few months but was captured on 4 November 1936 by Francoist troops led by General Fernando Barrón. Dr. Aurelio Mendiguchía Carriche, director of the psychiatric hospital, was appointed the first provisional mayor.

=== Transformation into a city ===
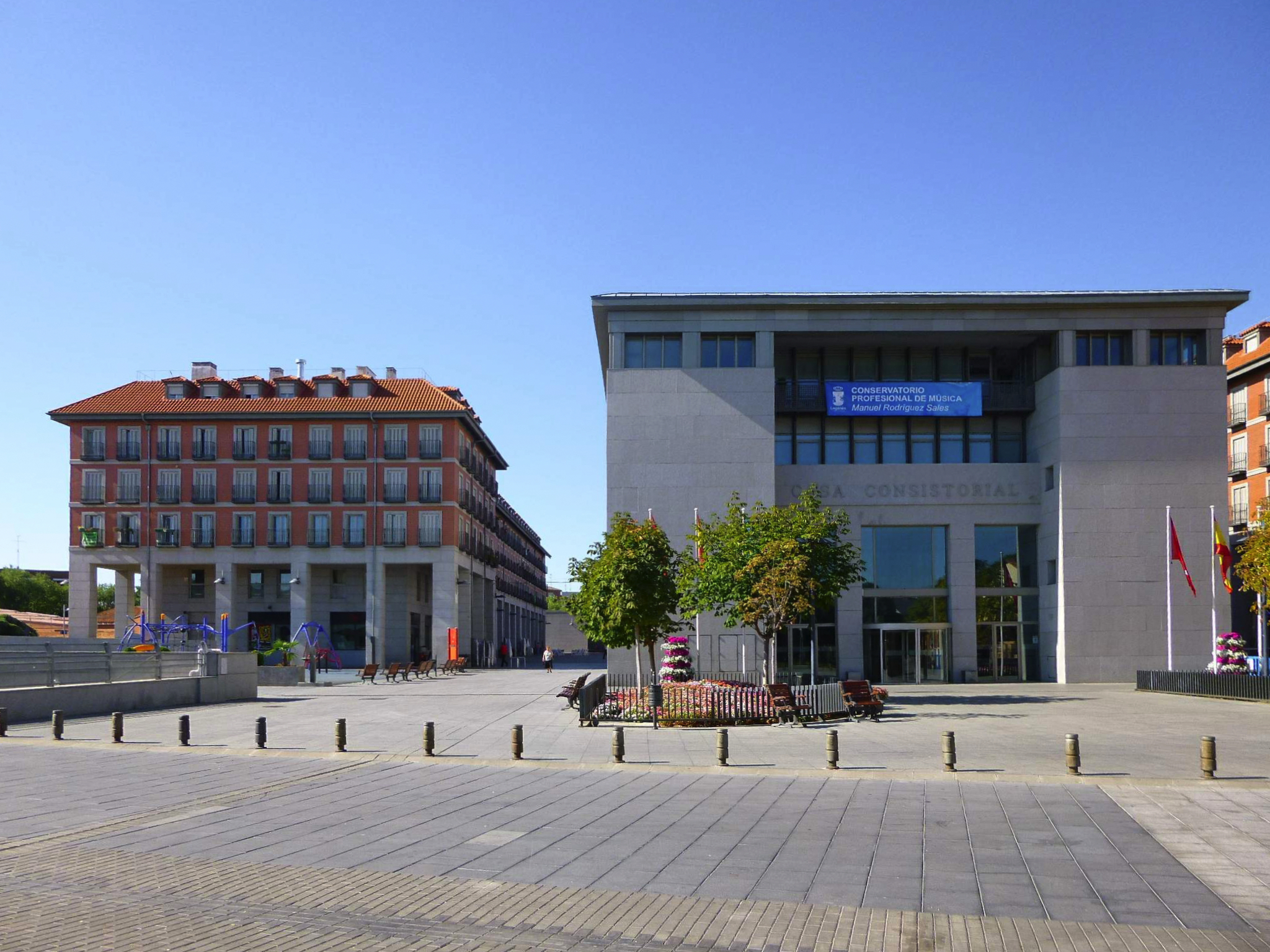
Town hall and entrance to the Plaza Mayor, inaugurated in 2007

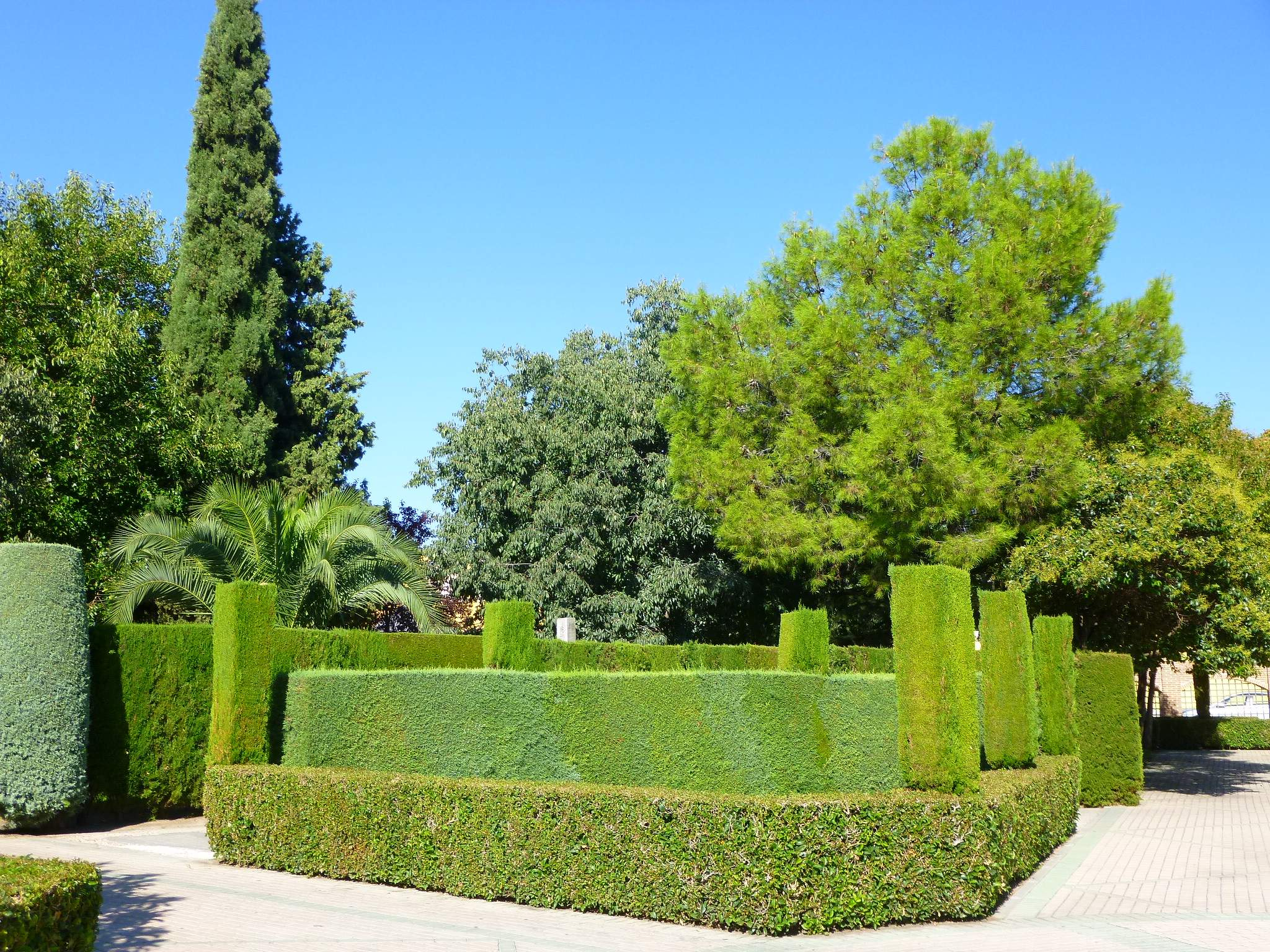
Central Park

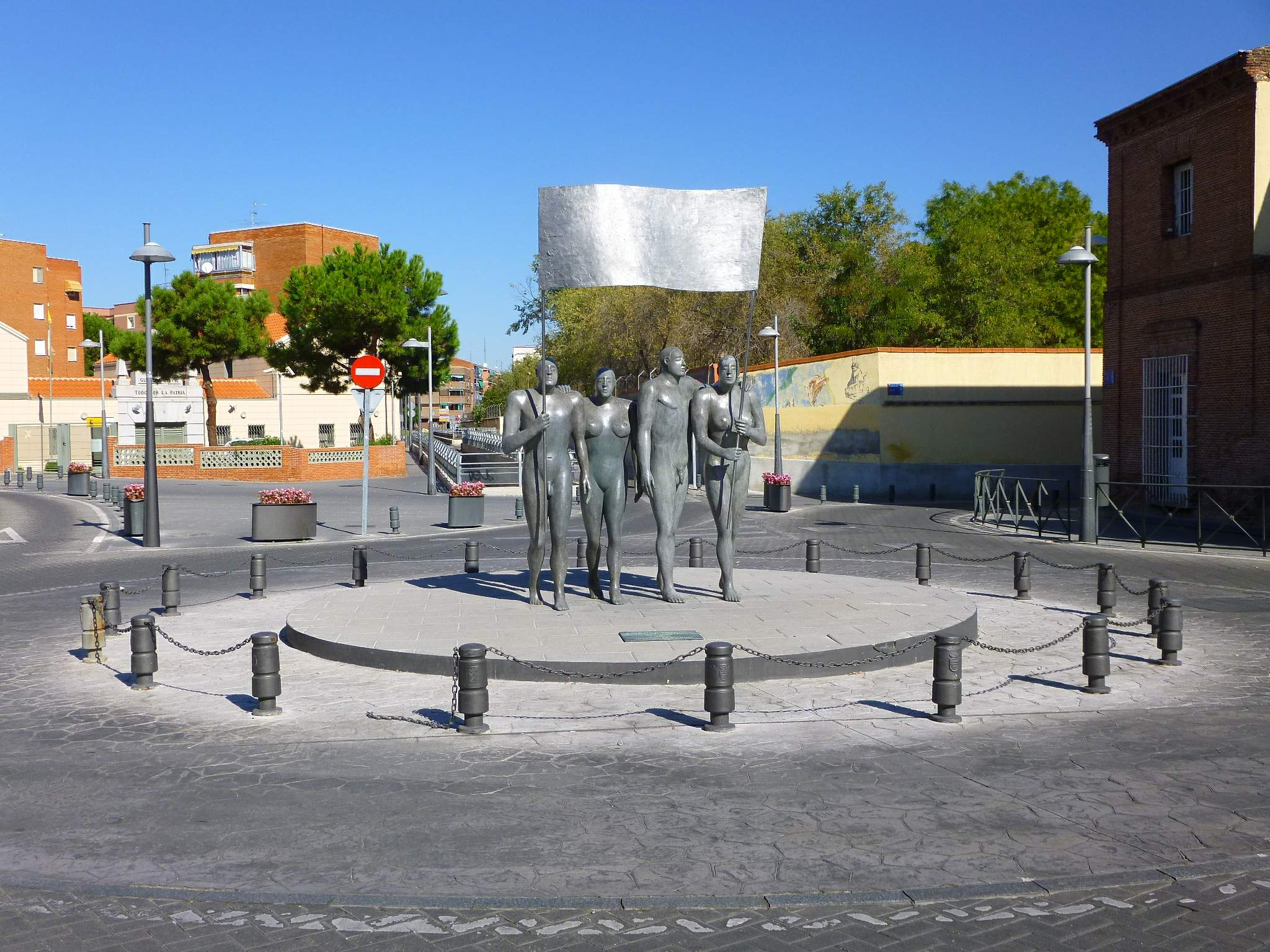
Monument to the Citizens' Movement (Esperanza D'Ors, 2006)

In the early 1950s, Leganés began its transformation into a residential city with the establishment of initial industries and housing blocks. The 1963 metropolitan area planning scheme shifted urban population concentration from Madrid to surrounding municipalities. Due to internal migration, many Spaniards who worked in Madrid settled in peripheral towns where housing was more affordable. Most of these new residents came from Extremadura, Castile, and Andalusia. The first neighborhood for workers was San Nicasio. From this point, Leganés was conceptualized as a satellite city of the capital, with responsibilities in housing and industry.

Urban growth was not sufficiently organized, and in the mid-1960s, spontaneous settlements emerged in outlying areas such as La Fortuna, Vereda de los Estudiantes, and Los Frailes. The first urban plan, approved in 1966, led to the creation of the residential neighborhoods of Zarzaquemada (1968) and El Carrascal (1974), which became the most populated. Much of the agricultural land was rezoned, and most of these residences are high-rise apartment blocks.

With the advent of democracy, new leaders prioritized improving public services, particularly education and healthcare, and developing infrastructure to reduce dependence on the capital. The 1985 General Urban Development Plan addressed traffic structuring, securing land for open spaces, creating new industrial zones, developing new neighborhoods (Quinto Centenario and Valdepelayos), promoting single-family housing, and rehabilitating degraded areas. One of the first measures was the construction of the Polvoranca Park on former farmland. In 1987, the Severo Ochoa Hospital opened, and the Savoy Barracks were transferred to the Charles III University of Madrid, which established its Polytechnic School there. In November 1989, the Parquesur shopping center, one of the largest commercial complexes in the Community of Madrid, was inaugurated.

=== Current situation ===
Leganés continued to expand in the 1990s with more structured urban planning. Although surpassed in population by Móstoles and Fuenlabrada, its demographic growth persisted. During this period, new neighborhoods such as Leganés Norte and Arroyo Culebro were developed. In 1997, the La Cubierta bullring with a retractable roof was inaugurated, followed by the Butarque Municipal Stadium in 1998. Additionally, the Madrid Metro incorporated the municipality into the new Line 12 (Metrosur) with six stations operational since 2003. Land use regulations led to the complete pedestrianization of the city center.

On 3 April 2004, a terrorist attack occurred in Leganés Norte, linked to the 11 March 2004 Madrid train bombings. Police located seven members of a jihadist terrorist cell barricaded in an apartment on Carmen Martín Gaite Street. Facing potential arrest by the Grupo Especial de Operaciones, who had evacuated the area hours earlier, the suspects detonated explosives, killing themselves. In addition to the terrorists, Sub-Inspector Francisco Javier Torronteras was killed, and four other officers were seriously injured. The damage to the residences necessitated the evacuation of many residents and the reconstruction of the apartments after demolition. In the following days, thousands of Leganés residents protested against terrorism, and a monument was erected in memory of the victims in front of the Zarzaquemada station.

In 2009, the Leganés Tecnológico industrial estate was opened. Today, the city has surpassed 180,000 inhabitants with the development of three new neighborhoods: Poza del Agua, Solagua, and Puerta de Fuenlabrada.

== Geography ==
Leganés is located just seven kilometers from the geographic center of the Iberian Peninsula, in the northern part of the Southern Subplateau (Central Plateau) at an elevation of 665 meters above sea level.

The first settlers established themselves on Quaternary alluvial lands, with two significant basins: the Butarque stream to the north and the Culebro stream to the south. The municipality owes its name to the numerous lagoons found in the area. Leganés is part of the Great Madrid Aquifer, with abundant underground water sources used for centuries for irrigation and domestic consumption, largely due to their accessibility at a depth of 15 meters.

The terrain is part of the plain between the middle-lower courses of the Guadarrama River and Manzanares River, characterized by gentle hills and ridges. The Manzanares River collects the area's waters. The lowest point, at 600 meters above sea level, is in the northeast where the Butarque stream enters Villaverde. The highest point is a ridge in the west, bordering Alcorcón, reaching 706 meters. The average elevation varies by neighborhood: the old town is at 665 meters, La Fortuna at 690 meters, and Zarzaquemada at 640 meters.

The total surface area is 43.1 km^{2}, encompassing residential zones, natural parks, and isolated settlements.

It borders Madrid to the north, following the capital's absorption of the current districts of Carabanchel and Villaverde Alto in the 1960s, and is 11 km south of the Puerta del Sol. To the east, it borders Getafe, 4 km from its center, with both municipalities sharing adjacent residential and industrial areas. To the west, it borders Alcorcón, and to the south, Fuenlabrada, each 6 km away. Its central location ensures that no provincial capital in peninsular Spain is more than 725 km away.

Urban location

=== Hydrography ===
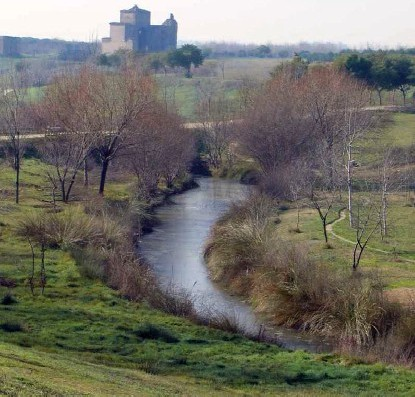
The Culebro stream in Leganés

The city is part of the Tagus Basin. To the north lies the Butarque stream, the most significant in the municipality's history. Approximately 20 km long, it originates in Boadilla del Monte and flows into the Manzanares River at the Manzanares Linear Park (Villaverde). It passes through the La Fortuna neighborhood, the Arroyo Butarque public park, and the Prado Overa industrial estate in Leganés. Numerous archaeological sites, from Paleolithic hunter settlements to medieval villages, have been found along its banks. The villages of Butarque and Overa, located nearby, were abandoned due to poor sanitary conditions. The stream has historically marked the territorial boundary with Madrid.

The Reajo Ravine (Valdegrullas), a tributary of the Butarque, crosses the northwest and reaches the Solagua and Campo de Tiro neighborhoods. A public park has been created at its confluence.

To the south lies the Culebro stream (La Recomba), the most significant tributary of the Manzanares River in its lower course. This 28 km stream originates in the Polvoranca Park (near the Mari Pascuala steppe lagoon) and flows through Fuenlabrada, Getafe, and Pinto. Its flow varies seasonally, peaking in spring and drying up completely in summer. Seasonal lagoons form in some areas of the municipality.

=== Fauna and flora ===
In the city's outskirts, in rural areas yet to be urbanized, various native herbaceous plants and shrubs form Mediterranean pastures with significant biodiversity, such as broom. Notable areas include Prado Grande (near La Fortuna and Las Presillas Park), with an abandoned almond plantation, the Viña Grande cork oak grove, the Buenavista hill, the Southern Forest, and the Polvoranca Park, a reclaimed cereal steppe marsh, now a semi-urban park. Along the banks of the Culebro stream and Butarque stream, remnants of native riparian vegetation include poplars, white poplars, willows, alders, elms, and ash trees.

Small holm oaks were once common but have largely disappeared due to urban development. Their abundance in some areas gave rise to the name El Carrascal.

The most significant fauna group is birds, with dozens of species ranging from common to occasional visitors. In urban areas, the house sparrow, feral pigeon, common blackbird, and Eurasian magpie are prevalent. In outlying areas and wooded parks, species such as the hoopoe, green woodpecker, great spotted woodpecker, red-legged partridge, and numerous passerines such as the serin, European robin, spotted flycatcher, and common chaffinch can be observed. Among raptors, the common kestrel is easily spotted hunting in cereal fields. In wetlands (Polvoranca and Butarque), resident species include the mallard, common coot, and common moorhen, while winter visitors include the great cormorant, black-headed gull, and northern shoveler. Mammals include the Iberian hare, European rabbit, and hedgehog. Amphibians are represented by the natterjack toad and Perez's frog, which are less demanding of environmental conditions. The Mari Pascuala lagoon, now an artificial pond in Polvoranca Park, is home to abundant common carp.

=== Climate ===
Leganés has a continental Mediterranean climate, typical of Mediterranean regions far from the sea, with more extreme temperatures than coastal areas. Winters are cold, dropping below 5 °C in December and January, with frequent frosts and rare snowfalls. Summers are hot and dry, often exceeding 30 °C in July and August. The daily temperature variation ranges between 10 and 15 °C.

Annual precipitation exceeds 400 mm, peaking in autumn and spring due to frequent thunderstorms with significant lightning and rainfall or hail. Other factors include over 2,850 hours of sunshine annually, gentle southwest winds, abundant groundwater, and scarce surface water. Like other Madrid municipalities, air pollution is a concern, particularly during periods without wind or rain, exacerbated by surrounding highways and heavy traffic.

The primary natural risks in Leganés are drought, influenced by climate or water reserves, and extreme cold and heat waves. Phenomena such as hurricanes, earthquakes, and tornadoes are extremely rare.

Climate data for Leganés (1981–2010)
Month	Jan	Feb	Mar	Apr	May	Jun	Jul	Aug	Sep	Oct	Nov	Dec	Year
Record high °C (°F)	20.8 (69.4)	22.6 (72.7)	26.4 (79.5)	30.7 (87.3)	35.4 (95.7)	40.6 (105.1)	41.6 (106.9)	40.6 (105.1)	40.0 (104.0)	30.6 (87.1)	25.2 (77.4)	19.2 (66.6)	41.6 (106.9)
Mean daily maximum °C (°F)	10.5 (50.9)	12.7 (54.9)	16.8 (62.2)	18.6 (65.5)	23.0 (73.4)	29.3 (84.7)	33.2 (91.8)	32.5 (90.5)	27.5 (81.5)	20.6 (69.1)	14.5 (58.1)	10.7 (51.3)	20.8 (69.4)
Daily mean °C (°F)	5.9 (42.6)	7.5 (45.5)	10.8 (51.4)	12.7 (54.9)	16.8 (62.2)	22.4 (72.3)	25.9 (78.6)	25.4 (77.7)	21.1 (70.0)	15.3 (59.5)	9.8 (49.6)	6.5 (43.7)	15.0 (59.0)
Mean daily minimum °C (°F)	1.2 (34.2)	2.4 (36.3)	4.9 (40.8)	6.9 (44.4)	10.5 (50.9)	15.6 (60.1)	18.5 (65.3)	18.2 (64.8)	14.6 (58.3)	9.9 (49.8)	5.0 (41.0)	2.4 (36.3)	9.2 (48.6)
Record low °C (°F)	−9.0 (15.8)	−9.2 (15.4)	−6.2 (20.8)	−2.6 (27.3)	−0.2 (31.6)	4.2 (39.6)	8.2 (46.8)	10.0 (50.0)	5.0 (41.0)	−0.2 (31.6)	−5.0 (23.0)	−8.6 (16.5)	−9.2 (15.4)
Average precipitation mm (inches)	29.5 (1.16)	31.6 (1.24)	23.6 (0.93)	38.3 (1.51)	39.3 (1.55)	19.3 (0.76)	9.4 (0.37)	9.4 (0.37)	22.1 (0.87)	50.1 (1.97)	48.0 (1.89)	44.8 (1.76)	365.4 (14.39)
Average precipitation days	6	5	4	7	6	3	1	2	3	7	6	7	56
Average snowy days	1	1	0	0	0	0	0	0	0	0	0	0	3
Average relative humidity (%)	76	68	58	56	52	42	35	38	48	64	73	79	57
Mean monthly sunshine hours	150	172	222	237	279	326	368	339	256	202	142	124	2,850
Source: Agencia Estatal de Meteorología

== Demography ==
Demographic evolution of Leganés between 1842 and 2021
Year	Pop.	±%
1842	2,838	—
1857	2,941	+3.6%
1860	3,115	+5.9%
1877	4,902	+57.4%
1887	5,407	+10.3%
1897	4,790	−11.4%
1900	4,149	−13.4%
1910	5,643	+36.0%
1920	4,224	−25.1%
1930	5,851	+38.5%
1940	5,180	−11.5%
1950	4,713	−9.0%
1960	7,655	+62.4%
1970	56,279	+635.2%
1981	163,910	+191.2%
1991	171,400	+4.6%
2001	173,584	+1.3%
2011	185,758	+7.0%
2021	188,687	+1.6%

Leganés has a population of 194,084 inhabitants, making it the fourth most populous municipality in the Community of Madrid and the thirty-second largest in Spain, ahead of San Sebastián.

The city has experienced significant demographic growth tied to the economic development of Madrid. Until the 1950s, its population hovered around 5,000. Subsequently, the influx of immigrants from other provinces seeking work in the capital spurred the construction of affordable housing in surrounding municipalities, which offered fewer services than the city center. The first apartment blocks were built in the San Nicasio neighborhood, with residents primarily from Extremadura, Castile, and Andalusia. This led to a population surge from 7,655 in 1960 to over 56,000 in 1970, and exceeding 160,000 by 1980. As this growth outpaced projections, many districts lack sufficient parking spaces. Since the advent of democracy, growth has been moderate, with urban planning implemented in new neighborhoods and a focus on public infrastructure such as schools and hospitals.

The foreign population has increased in recent years, reaching 118 foreigners per 1,000 residents, below the regional average. Spanish nationals account for 88.19% of the population, with other nationalities comprising the remaining 11.90%. The largest foreign communities are from Romania (4,104), Morocco (3,606), Colombia (3,047), Ecuador (2,727), and Peru (2,210).

Initially considered a commuter town, as many residents worked in Madrid, Leganés has reduced its reliance on the capital since the 1980s by developing industrial estates, commercial centers, educational institutions, clinics, and a general hospital. Leganés has been part of Spain's Law of Large Cities since 2006. Its population was 188,691 in 2014, according to the INE.

== Economy ==
Until recently, Leganés was a well-connected commuter town in the Madrid metropolitan area. Its population has tripled in less than a decade, and residential developments around the historic center have multiplied. Concurrently, primary activities such as horticulture (supplying the capital) and livestock farming have declined in importance. In contrast, the establishment of various industries has increased due to improved transportation links and the scarcity and high cost of industrial land in the capital.

=== Industrial areas ===
The municipality has the following industrial parks:

- Nuestra Señora de Butarque: located between the Zarzaquemada and El Carrascal neighborhoods and Getafe's El Bercial neighborhood.
- El Portillo, commonly known as Ciudad del Automóvil, currently expanding southward along the M-409.
- Polvoranca: home to the former Tabacalera warehouse, now Logista.
- La Fortuna: a small, traditional industrial area within the urban core, with a new estate recently established near the M-40.
- Prado Overa: situated along the A-42 Toledo Highway.
- San José de Valderas: located adjacent to Alcorcón's urban core, though within Leganés's municipal boundaries.
- La Laguna: centered around the M-50, hosting companies such as Porcelanosa and Verdecora.
- Leganés Tecnológico: dedicated to high-tech companies, located near the M-40 in collaboration with the Charles III University.
- Sur M-50: situated next to Fuenlabrada's El Naranjo neighborhood, though within Leganés's boundaries.

Major companies operating in the municipality include Logista, Roche Farma (pharmaceutical production), Tapón Corona (bottle cap manufacturing), Renault Industrial Vehicles (crankshaft production), Zardoya Otis (elevator and escalator manufacturing), Empresa Martín (interurban bus network), Ramos Sierra (electrical material distributors), Makro, Decathlon, Obramat, and El Corte Inglés (retail).

=== Commerce ===
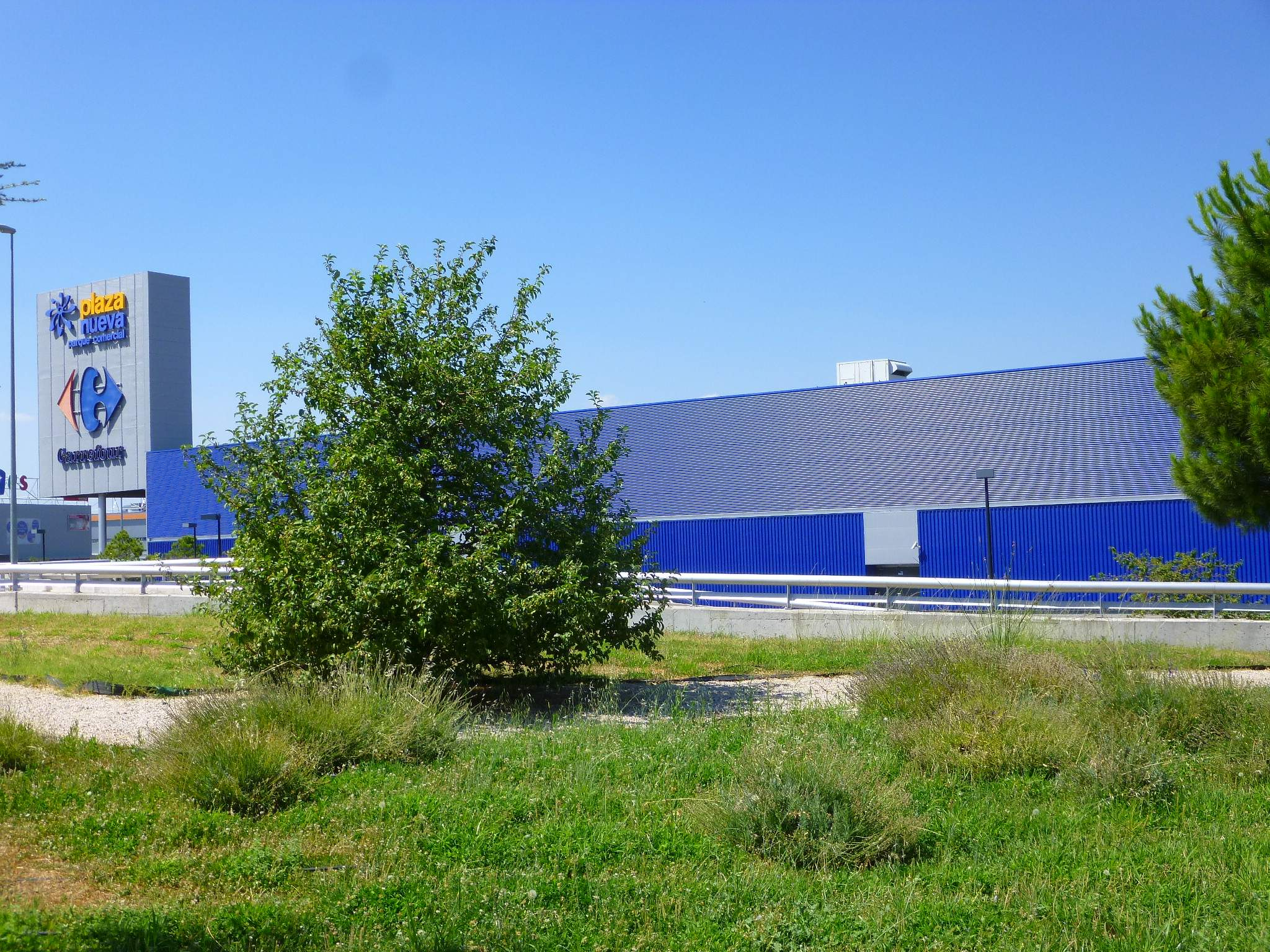
Plaza Nueva Commercial Park

The following shopping centers are located within Leganés:

- Leganés Uno: the oldest, situated in the San Nicasio neighborhood.
- Parquesur: located at the intersection of the M-45, A-42, and the Leganés-Villaverde road.
- Arroyosur: situated between the M-409 and M-50.
- Parque Comercial Plaza Nueva: opened in spring 2009, located at the base of the Cemetery Slope, near the M-425 and the Butarque Municipal Stadium.
- Sambil Outlet Madrid: the most modern, inaugurated in 2017, located between the M-411 and M-40.

Additionally, there are standalone large retail stores such as Makro in the Nuestra Señora de Butarque estate, and nearby shopping centers in adjacent municipalities, including a Hipercor and El Corte Inglés in El Bercial (Getafe) and the CC Islazul in Carabanchel.

== Administration and politics ==
=== Institutions ===
Leganés is governed by three levels of public administration, each with distinct responsibilities and jurisdictions. The Leganés City Council is the main authority in the city, overseeing daily municipal affairs and critical matters such as urban planning, transportation, municipal tax collection, traffic safety management through the local police, festival organization, and maintenance of public roads and gardens. It is also responsible for constructing municipal facilities.

The local government bodies include the City Council Plenary and its Committees, the Mayor, Deputy Mayors, and the Local Government Board. Plenary sessions, both ordinary and extraordinary, are held at the city hall located in Leganés's Plaza Mayor. The Casa del Reloj in Leganés houses the citizen services office. Additionally, there are District Boards for the neighborhoods of La Fortuna, San Nicasio, and Zarzaquemada. The municipality also provides legal advisory services, a social council, and a special commission for suggestions and complaints.

Above the City Council is the Community of Madrid, which manages responsibilities delegated by the central government. As Madrid is a single-province autonomous community, there is no provincial council. Leganés hosts the headquarters of the Madrid-South Territorial Area Directorate. The Community holds extensive powers in public education, healthcare, employment offices, social services, transportation, economic policies, commerce, and more. It is also tasked with building and maintaining health centers, hospitals, schools, universities, and senior residences.

The highest authority is the General State Administration, which handles matters such as security (National Police and Army), justice, and Renfe trains. These responsibilities are coordinated by the Government Delegation in the Community of Madrid. The three levels of administration collaborate to ensure the municipality’s development.

=== Municipal government ===
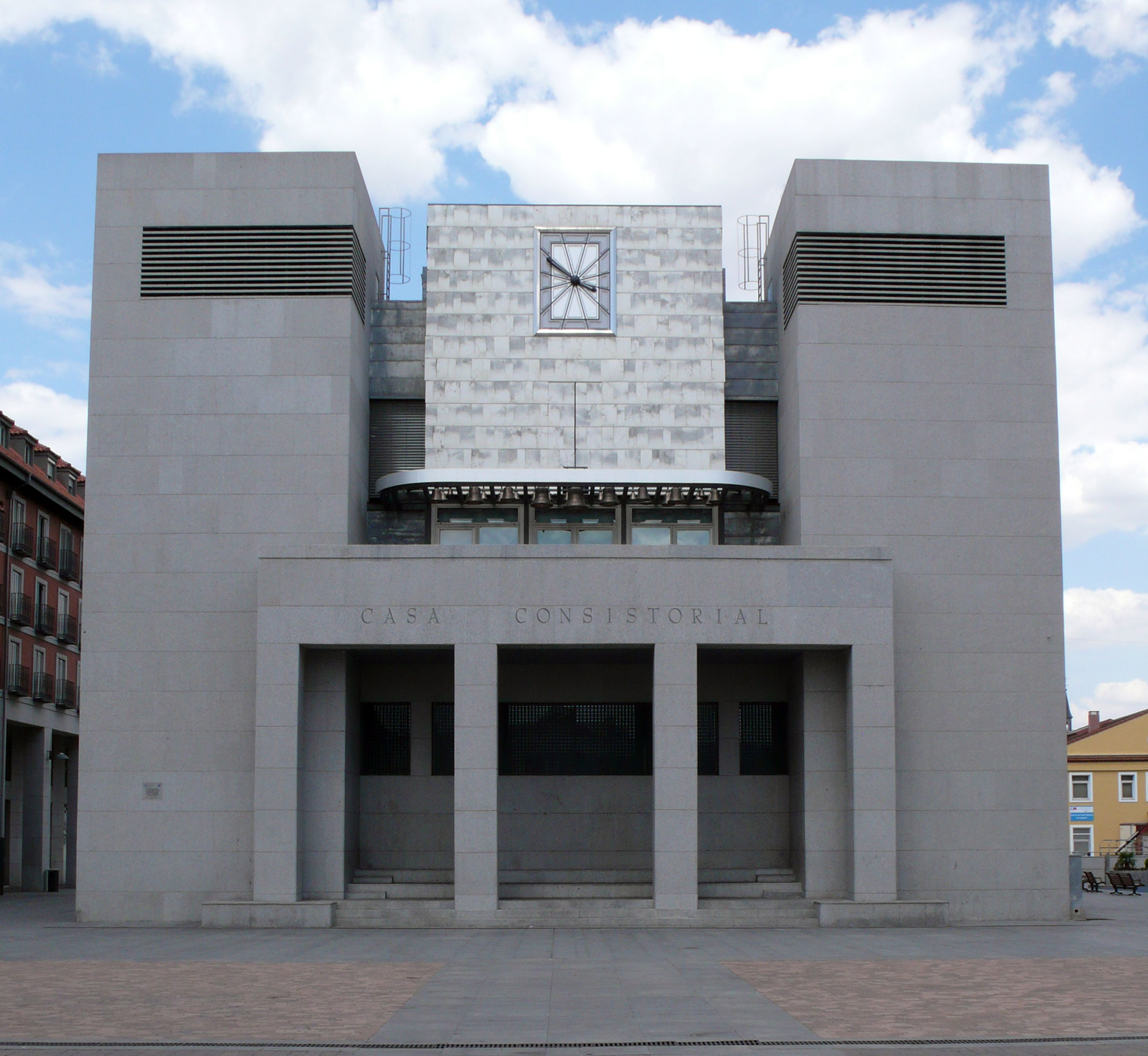
Leganés City Hall, where plenary sessions are held

The Leganés City Council government is elected through universal suffrage in elections held every four years. The D'Hondt method is used in Spain to allocate councilor seats, roughly proportional to the votes received by each candidacy. The plenary consists of 27 councilors.

In the 2019 Spanish local elections, the PSOE was the most voted party, securing 10 seats, four more than in the previous election and more than double the votes of the second-placed party. Unión por Leganés became the main opposition party, while the People's Party came third, 180 votes behind, both with four seats. Podemos and Citizens each obtained three councilors, Más Madrid-Leganemos secured two, and Vox entered the council with one seat.

Since the restoration of democracy in Spain, twelve municipal elections have been held. The mayor since 2023 has been Miguel Ángel Recuenco Checa of the People's Party (PP).

In the late 20th century, Leganés was known as a stronghold for left-wing parties in the Community of Madrid, forming part of the so-called "red belt" alongside other municipalities such as Getafe and Fuenlabrada. As a result, the city was governed by the PSOE for over three decades, either alone or in coalition with IU. From 2003 to 2011, the PP was the most voted party locally and regionally but never achieved an absolute majority.

The first elected mayor was Ramón Espinar Gallego (1979–1983), followed by Fernando Abad Bécquer (1983–1991) and José Luis Pérez Ráez (1991–2007). A lack of agreement between PSOE and IU allowed Guadalupe Bragado of the PP to become the first conservative mayor in 2007, but a motion of censure removed her after 23 days. She was succeeded by the socialist Rafael Gómez Montoya (2007–2011). As neither PSOE nor IU secured a majority, Jesús Gómez Ruiz became the first PP mayor to complete a full term. However, in the 2015 elections, the PSOE regained control, with Santiago Llorente Gutiérrez taking office.

Period	Mayor	Party
1979-1983	Ramón Espinar Gallego	Spanish Socialist Workers' Party
1983-1991	Fernando Abad Bécquer	Spanish Socialist Workers' Party
1991-2007	José Luis Pérez Ráez	Spanish Socialist Workers' Party
2007-2007	Guadalupe Bragado Cordero	People's Party
2007-2011	Rafael Gómez Montoya	Spanish Socialist Workers' Party
2011-2015	Jesús Gómez Ruiz	People's Party
2015-2023	Santiago Llorente Gutiérrez	Spanish Socialist Workers' Party
2023-act.	Miguel Ángel Recuenco Checa	People's Party

Results of municipal elections in Leganés
Political Party	2023			2019			2015			2011			2007		
Political Party	%	Votes	Councilors	%	Votes	Councilors	%	Votes	Councilors	%	Votes	Councilors	%	Votes	Councilors
People's Party	31.70	30,611	9	15.38	14,311	4	20.02	19,081	6	40.08	37,445	12	39.41	36,283	12
Spanish Socialist Workers' Party	27.41	26,470	8	32.39	30,133	10	21.74	20,726	6	27.72	25,900	8	38.25	35,213	11
Unión por Leganés (ULEG)	11.47	11,073	3	15.58	14,491	4	20.42	19,463	6	13.28	12,409	4	5.89	5,422	1
Más Madrid-Leganemos	10.60	10,234	3	7.31	6,803	2	21.14	20,148	6	—	—	—	—	—	—
Vox	7.88	7,608	2	6.05	5,632	1	0.57	544	0	—	—	—	—	—	—
Podemos-United Left (IU)	6.57	6,345	2	11.15	10,374	3	5.33	5,079	1	11.48	10,723	3	12.95	11,920	3
Citizens (CS)	1.15	1,119	0	10.42	9,695	3	7.93	7,556	2	—	—	—	0.35	320	0
Communist Party of the Peoples of Spain (PCPE)	0.30	294	0	—	—	—	—	—	—	0.73	678	0	0.34	315	0
United Left of the Community of Madrid	—	—	—	0.86	803	0	—	—	—	—	—	—	—	—	—
Real Equality (IGRE)	—	—	—	0.11	98	0	—	—	—	—	—	—	—	—	—
Center Union (UDEC)	—	—	—	0.10	94	0	0.13	128	0	—	—	—	—	—	—
Union, Progress and Democracy (UPyD)	—	—	—	—	—	—	1.64	1,567	0	4.00	3,737	0	—	—	—
Green Coalition (CV)	—	—	—	—	—	—	—	—	—	—	—	—	1.33	1,228	0

=== Territorial organization ===
Leganés is administratively divided into neighborhoods. The main municipal body is the Local Government Board. The two most populated neighborhoods (Zarzaquemada and San Nicasio) and La Fortuna (located farther from the city center) have their own District Boards with specific responsibilities for more decentralized governance. Although most of the population resides in the urban core, the lack of an urban plan in the 1960s led to spontaneous settlements in outlying areas, such as La Fortuna and Vereda de los Estudiantes.

The municipal boundaries of Leganés until the 19th century corresponded to the current Centro neighborhood. In 1958, expansion began with the San Nicasio neighborhood, primarily inhabited by immigrants. Mayor Saturnino del Yerro promoted the expansion of the central area in 1960, creating new neighborhoods such as Descubridores, Vírgenes, and Las Flores. Later, the municipality assumed administrative control of the La Fortuna settlement, and in 1966, it implemented the first General Urban Ordinance Plan (PGOU), expanding eastward (Zarzaquemada). Due to the large influx of immigrants, this plan had several shortcomings, such as underestimating land requirements. Since the 1980s, the focus has been on orderly construction and the recovery of green spaces.

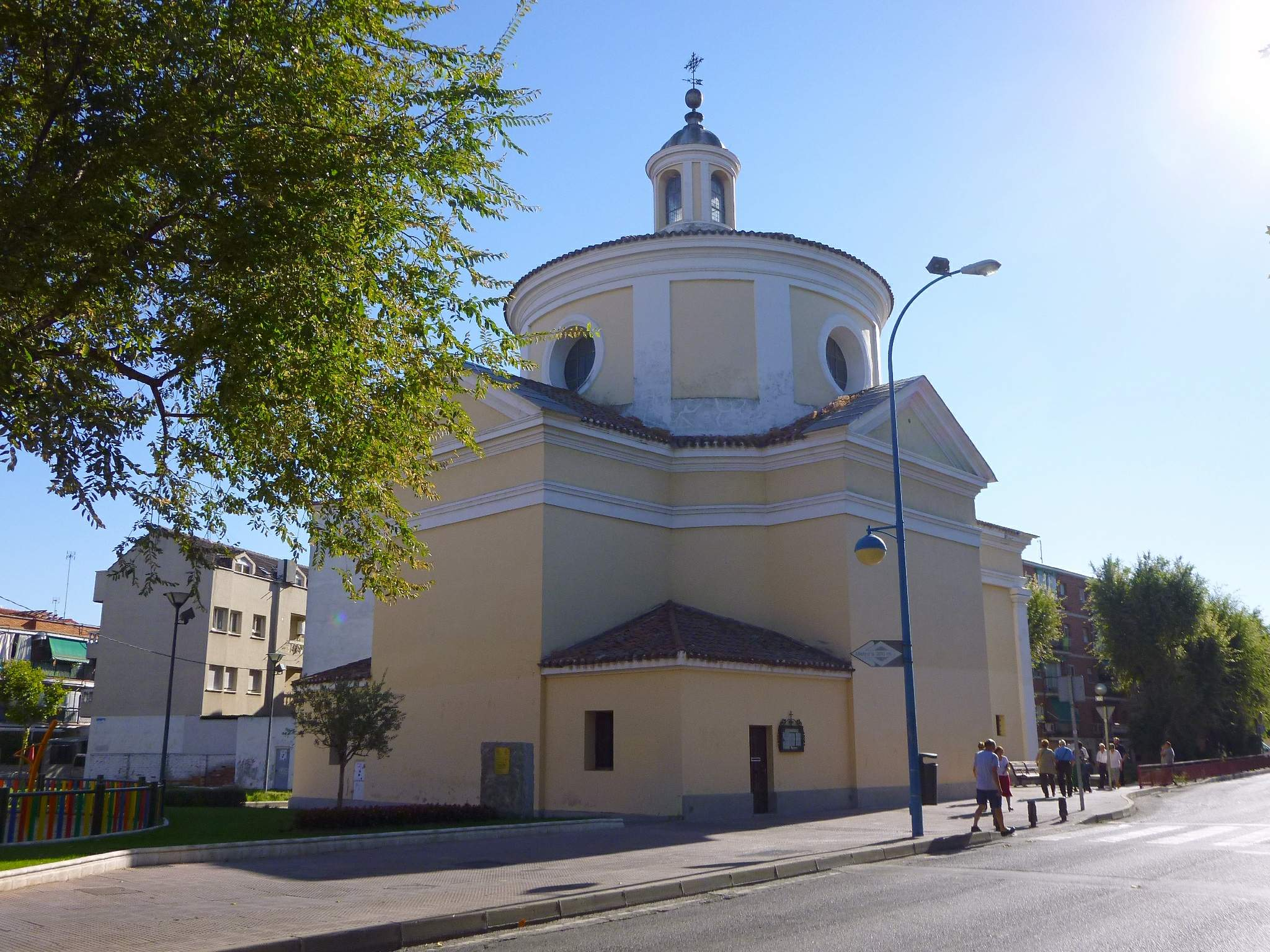
Hermitage of Saint Nicasius

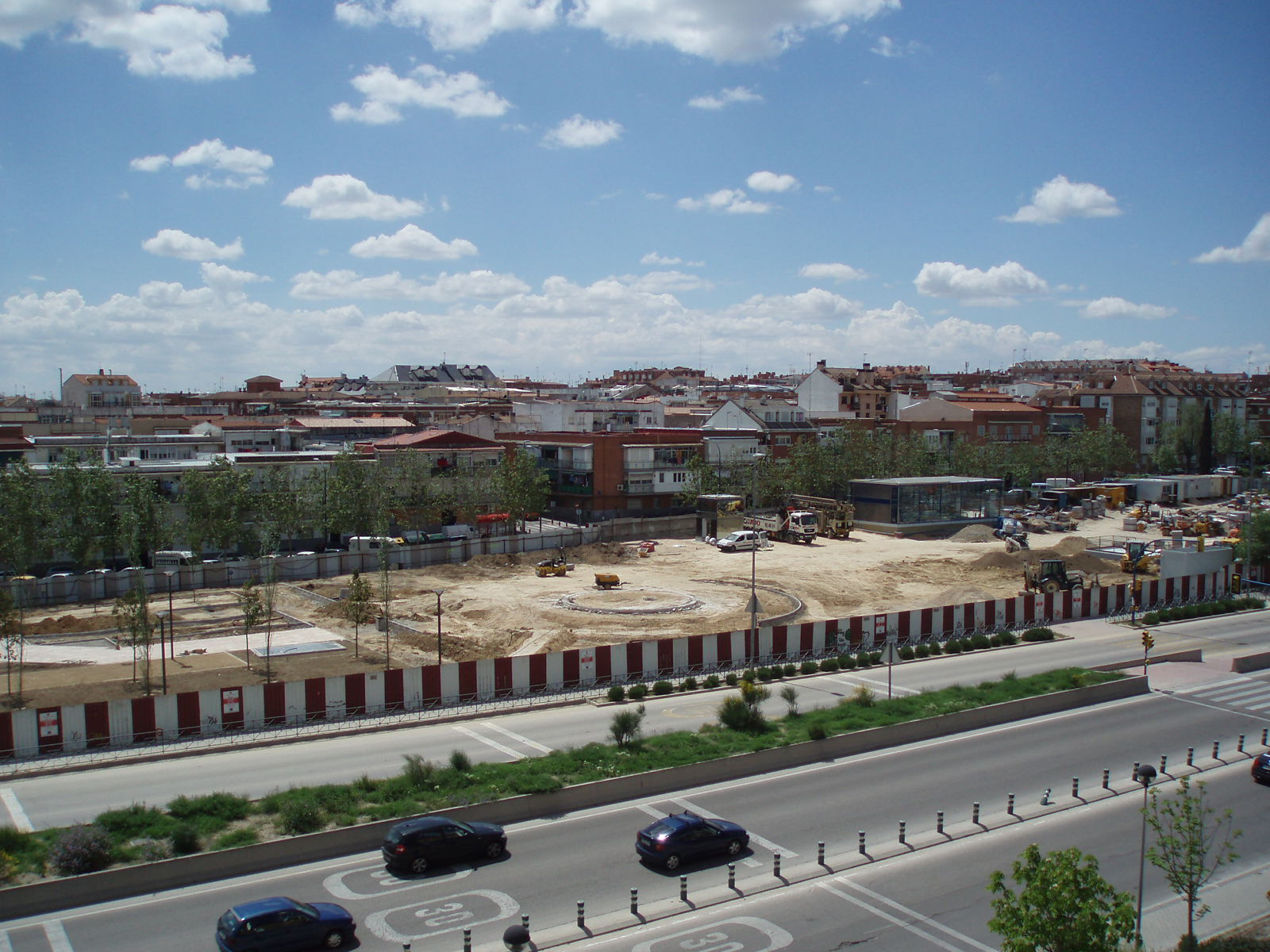
Panoramic view of La Fortuna

The neighborhoods of Leganés are as follows:

1. Leganés Centro: The oldest core of the city, it houses historic buildings such as the El Salvador Church, the former asylum, and the Royal Walloon Guards Barracks, now used by the Charles III University of Madrid. In 2007, the Plaza Mayor was built on the former municipal football field. In addition to the historic core, it is subdivided into smaller neighborhoods (Batallas, Los Santos, Flores, Descubridores, Escritores, and Vírgenes), named after their streets. To the southeast are the Casa del Reloj (citizen services office), the courts, the tax office, the La Cubierta bullring, and the fairgrounds.
2. San Nicasio: The first expansion of Leganés, named after an 18th century hermitage designed by Ventura Rodríguez. It is separated from the center by railway tracks. Previously divided by a military railway, a boulevard has since been built over it. Notable sites include the hermitage, the Leganés Station (Renfe, Cercanías, and Metro), and the José Saramago Civic Center. The city council undertook a comprehensive remodeling plan in the 2000s to modernize it, along with an urban expansion plan (PAU) extending to the Poza del Agua neighborhood. San Nicasio and its extension are largely divided into two parts based on street names: rivers and provinces.
3. Zarzaquemada: An eastern expansion, it is the most densely populated neighborhood. Its main artery is Rey Juan Carlos I Avenue, with key streets being Los Monegros (north) and La Rioja (south). It features the Egaleo Amphitheater, the Pedroches Health Center, extensive green areas (Chopera and Picasso parks), two parishes, and the Zarzaquemada Station (Cercanías). Most streets are named after Spanish regions.
4. El Carrascal: Separated from Zarzaquemada by Europa Avenue, it consists mainly of high-rise blocks with improved urban planning. It includes the Rigoberta Menchú Civic Center, the Pabellón Europa, the Ice Rink, and the Parquesur shopping center. Streets are named after European countries.
5. Quinto Centenario: A residential expansion north of San Nicasio, with single-family homes and apartment blocks. It houses the Butarque Stadium and the Hispanidad Park. Streets are named after Latin American countries.
6. Valdepelayos: A residential neighborhood in the southwest, completed in the 1990s. Streets are named after Spanish politicians.
7. Montepinos: A former settlement south of the city, located behind the Severo Ochoa Hospital. It borders Valdepelayos to the west and includes the Los Frailes Park.
8. Derechos Humanos: A southeastern residential neighborhood, also known as Los Tilos, featuring the Las Dehesillas Cultural Center and the Sculpture Museum. Streets are named after human rights.
9. Leganés Norte: A northeastern residential neighborhood, separated from Zarzaquemada by the railway line. Built in the 1990s, it includes two green areas (Leganés Norte and Palestina parks) and the Central Library and Municipal Archive. Streets are named after women.
10. Campo de Tiro: A northwestern residential expansion of San Nicasio, named after its former military use. It hosts a university residence hall of the Charles III University and the Valdegrullas Park. Streets are named after trees and plants.
11. Solagua: An expansion in the northwest (as an extension of San Nicasio), bordering Campo de Tiro and Quinto Centenario to the south, Leganés Norte to the southeast, and San Nicasio to the southwest. Streets are named after Central American countries, European capitals, and characters from Don Quixote.
12. Arroyo Culebro: A southern expansion separated from Valdepelayos by the M-406 and surrounded by major southern Madrid highways. A residential neighborhood with townhouses and apartment blocks, it includes a green area along the Recomba stream and the Polvoranca Park. It has a Cercanías station. Streets are named after Madrid municipalities and mayors.
13. Poza del Agua: The newest neighborhood, built in the late 2000s. It borders San Nicasio to the southeast, Solagua to the east, and Salvador Allende Avenue to the north and west. Streets are named after planets, constellations, and Vicente Ferrer.
14. Puerta de Fuenlabrada: A new neighborhood near the Severo Ochoa Hospital and the Ciudad del Automóvil industrial estate. It has two supermarkets (Ahorramás and Mercadona) and a pedestrian bridge connecting to the industrial estate. Streets are named after sports.

The following neighborhoods belong to Leganés but are outside the urban core:

1. La Fortuna: Located five kilometers from the center, between the M-40 and the Radial 5. Founded in 1960 by residents and immigrants from Orcasitas, it developed without proper urban planning. In the 1980s, the city council implemented a plan to provide public services. It includes the Serafín Díez Antón Park and the Sambil Outlet shopping center. In 1993, a District Board was established, one of the first examples of local decentralization in the Community of Madrid. It is connected to the Madrid Metro via Line 11 to Plaza Elíptica. Streets are named after saints (matching the names of the founding family) and Portuguese towns.
2. Vereda de los Estudiantes: Another administratively controlled settlement, separated from the city by the M-406, near the municipal border with Getafe. Founded in the 1950s by immigrants, mostly from Extremadura and Andalusia, it was initially called "Barrio del Candil" due to the lack of public lighting. It is now a residential neighborhood. Streets are named after provinces.

The Viña Grande neighborhood was part of Leganés until 1994, when its residents voted in a binding referendum to join Alcorcón. It is now part of San José de Valderas.

=== Justice ===
Leganés has police stations for the National Police and Municipal Police, as well as a Civil Guard barracks and guardhouse. The municipality forms the ninth judicial district of the Community of Madrid, with eight First Instance and Instruction Courts and one Court for Violence Against Women.

== Monuments and places of interest ==
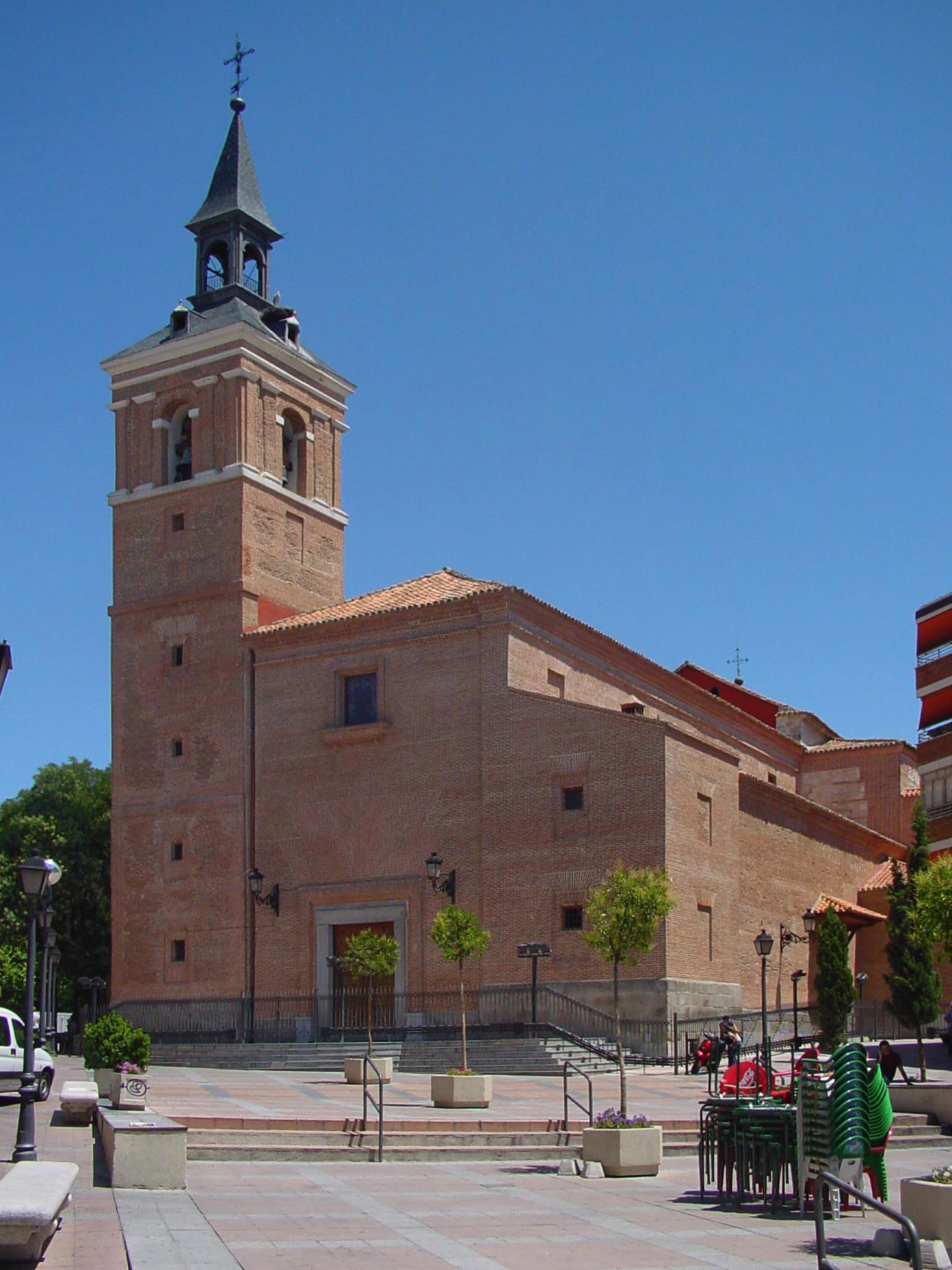
San Salvador Parish Church

San Salvador Church: The church's origins date back to the 15th century, though the current structure began construction in 1662. It features a baroque main altarpiece crafted by José de Churriguera between 1701 and 1720, with an oil painting of the Transfiguration by the Venetian Francesco Leonardoni, who also painted the side altarpieces in 1702. The church's parish organ, built by José de Verdalonga, is also noteworthy.

San Nicasio Hermitage: A neoclassical structure designed by Ventura Rodríguez between 1772 and 1785, commissioned by the March of Leganés in honor of Saint Nicasius. It has undergone several restorations.

In addition to San Nicasio, the Our Lady of Butarque hermitage (restored) is also notable.

Santa Isabel Healthcare Facility: Spain's first psychiatric hospital of its kind and the municipality's first enterprise. It was a pioneer in psychiatric care, utilizing the former Medinaceli palace. Its neo-Mudéjar façade was largely designed by architect Emilio Rodríguez Ayuso, with courtyards tended by patients at the time. It is currently under restoration, with part of the building serving as a health center.

Polvoranca Park: Designed in the 1980s, it spans 150 hectares entirely within Leganés. It includes several lakes, an arboretum, and a botanical garden. The park contains the ruins of the San Pedro hermitage, the last remnant of the former Polvoranca village.

Royal Walloon Guards Barracks: Also known as the Sabatini Building or Saboya Barracks, it was designed by architect Francisco Sabatini. Construction was completed in 1783, and it served military purposes until 1987, when the Saboya Regiment vacated it. The building was demolished to accommodate the Charles III University of Madrid and has been fully rebuilt inside and out.

Leganés Plaza Mayor and Automaton Clock: The Plaza Mayor was inaugurated in 2008 on the site of the former CD Leganés football field. It houses the city hall, a sports facility, and various businesses. The city hall features a Swiss automaton clock, the first of its kind in Spain.

Leganés Open-Air Sculpture Museum: Located in Las Dehesillas Park, it was promoted by sculptor Luis Arencibia through an agreement with the Reina Sofía Museum. The museum loaned the City Council 50 large-scale sculptures previously exhibited at the Spanish Museum of Contemporary Art. The park is free to enter and open until midnight, featuring works by Martín Chirino, Agustín Ibarrola, and Jorge Oteiza, among others.

== Services ==
=== Education ===
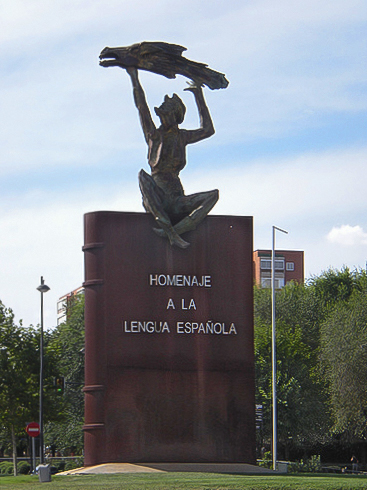
Sculpture honoring the Spanish language and Don Quixote

The municipality has numerous educational institutions, mostly public primary and secondary schools, as well as a special education center and the CEMU. Notably, the Charles III University's School of Engineering was established in the late 1980s. Leganés also has its own non-university teacher training and support center. Like other cities in the Community of Madrid, Leganés depends on the regional Education Department.

Early childhood, primary, and secondary education

Leganés's compulsory education network expanded significantly after 1975 with the advent of democracy in Spain. The city had no secondary schools until 1976, when the José de Churriguera High School was opened with morning and afternoon shifts. Currently, the city has over 30 public primary schools and 16 secondary schools. It also has private education centers and a special education school, Alfonso X El Sabio.

Higher education

Since 1990, Leganés has been home to the Charles III University of Madrid. Its campus includes the School of Engineering and contributed to revitalizing the city center through actions such as the restoration of the Royal Walloon Guards Barracks (Sabatini Building) and the pedestrianization of the area. The Leganés Campus is fully integrated into the city center, featuring multiple buildings, a library, the Padre Soler Auditorium, and a sports center. It also includes the Leganés Tecnológico project, in which the university participates, and a student residence.

The municipality has had a University School of Nursing since 1991.

National University of Distance Education

Since the 2010–11 academic year, Leganés has hosted a University Classroom of the National University of Distance Education (UNED), part of the Madrid South Associated Center. Its facilities are located at the José de Churriguera High School. The Madrid South Center has over 8,000 students, with around 1,000 enrolled in Leganés.

The University Classroom has two digital whiteboards for distance learning (AVIP), the institute's library as a study space, eight classrooms, a multipurpose room, and a cafeteria.

Leganés offers degree programs including access courses for those over 25 and 45, Spanish Language and Literature, Environmental Sciences, English Studies, Industrial Technology Engineering, and Philosophy. It also offers the Senior Program for those over 50 and language courses (CUID).

Other centers

Among Leganés's educational projects, the Children's City School (CEMU), founded by Alberto Muñiz Sánchez, stands out. Established in 1970 to house and educate children with challenges or disadvantages, it provides a home for 120 minors in residential care and serves external students, promoting resocialization through a participatory system. Modeled after Father Silva's Boys Town in Ourense, it even has its own mayor.

The Leganés Official Language School has operated independently since 1989, having started as a section of the Alcorcón Official Language School before becoming autonomous.

=== Healthcare ===
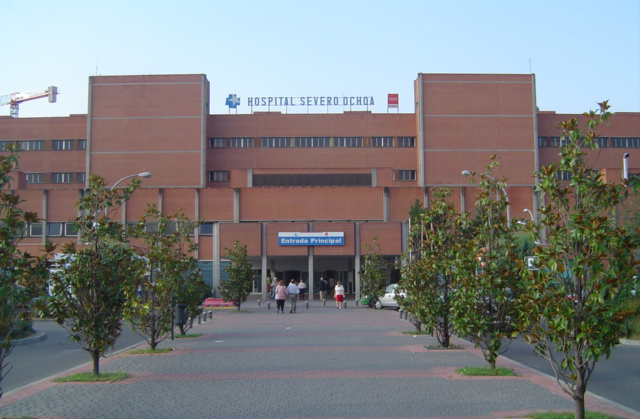
Severo Ochoa Hospital

The main hospital in Leganés is the Severo Ochoa University Hospital, complemented by several public health centers across various neighborhoods. The city is a pioneer in mental health care, with two facilities: the José Germain Center and the Santa Isabel Center. Additionally, it has a Drug Addiction Care Center. The municipality forms a single basic health zone under the Community of Madrid’s new healthcare map.

=== Transportation ===
==== Road network ====
Bordering Madrid, Leganés benefits from two major ring roads of the capital:

- M-40, a Madrid ring road, encircles the north of the city, separating it from the Madrid municipal border and crossing the La Fortuna neighborhood. Exits 27, 28, and 30.
- M-50, a Madrid ring road, encircles the south of the city, marking the boundary with Fuenlabrada. Exits 53A, 55, and 59.
- Radial 5, a toll road that runs along the west of the city, from Carabanchel to Navalcarnero.

The following roads are part of the main network:

- M-45, a Madrid ring road, encircles the east of the city, separating it from the Villaverde district and connecting to Getafe. Exits 1, 2B, and 6.
- M-402: Connects the M-45 from Villaverde to central Leganés.
- M-406: Starts at Avenida de Los Castillos in Alcorcón, crosses southern Leganés, and ends at the A-42 near the Getafe Hospital.
- M-407: Also known as the Polvoranca motorway, it starts at the Polvoranca Park exit and leads to Griñón. It connects to the M-50.
- M-425: Also known as the Leganés to Carabanchel road, it starts at Avenida de Carabanchel in northern Leganés, passes through the Leganés Tecnológico industrial estate, and ends at Vía Lusitana.

The Adolfo Suárez Madrid–Barajas Airport is a 30-minute drive via the M-40. It can also be accessed from Leganés via the Metro and Cercanías networks.

==== Buses ====
The public service of buses (urban and interurban), railway, and metro is integrated into the Madrid Regional Transport Consortium, a public entity of the Community of Madrid. Leganés is part of the B1 fare zone.

Currently, there is one urban line, 18 interurban lines, and 3 night lines. As a municipal service outside the capital, all buses are green. Most are operated by Martín, S.A., except for three run by Avanza Movilidad Integral.

===== Urban lines =====
Line	Route	Operator
1	Vereda de los Estudiantes – La Fortuna	Martín, S.A.

===== Interurban lines =====
Line	Route	Operator
432	Madrid (Villaverde Bajo-Cruce) – Leganés	Avanza Movilidad Integral
450	Getafe – Leganés – Alcorcón	Avanza Movilidad Integral
468	Getafe – Griñón / Casarrubuelos / Serranillos	Avanza Movilidad Integral
480	Madrid (Plaza Elíptica) – Leganés (Leganés Central)	Martín, S.A.
481	Madrid (Oporto) – Leganés (Parquesur – Hospital)	Martín, S.A.
482	Madrid (Aluche) – Leganés (Arroyo Culebro)	Martín, S.A.
483	Madrid (Aluche) – Leganés (Vereda de los Estudiantes)	Martín, S.A.
484	Madrid (Oporto) – Leganés (Leganés Central)	Martín, S.A.
485	Madrid (Aluche) – Leganés (Norte – Montepinos)	Martín, S.A.
486	Madrid (Oporto) – Leganés (Valdepelayo)	Martín, S.A.
487	Madrid (Aluche) – Leganés (San Nicasio)	Martín, S.A.
488	Leganés (San Nicasio) – Getafe (Getafe Norte)	Martín, S.A.
491	Madrid (Aluche) – Fuenlabrada (Barrio del Naranjo)	Martín, S.A.
492	Madrid (Aluche) – Fuenlabrada (Parque Granada)	Martín, S.A.
493	Madrid (Aluche) – Fuenlabrada (Urbanización Loranca)	Martín, S.A.
497	Leganés – Moraleja de Enmedio (Las Colinas)	Martín, S.A.
N802	Madrid (Atocha) – Leganés (Vereda de los Estudiantes)	Martín, S.A.
N803	Madrid (Atocha) – Fuenlabrada (Barrio del Naranjo)	Martín, S.A.
N804	Madrid (Atocha) – Fuenlabrada	Martín, S.A.

==== Railway ====
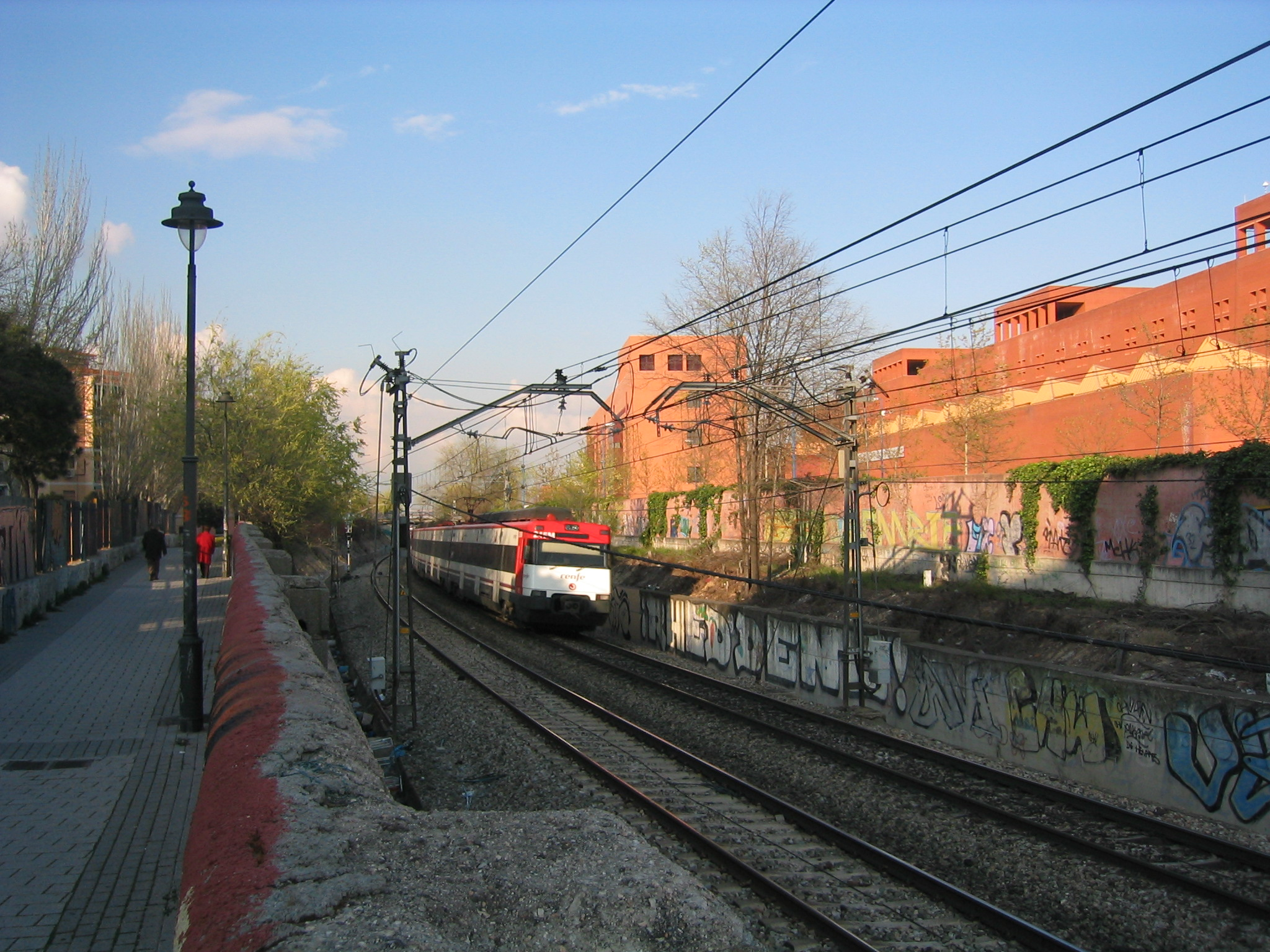
The railway line in Leganés crosses the city and has not been fully buried

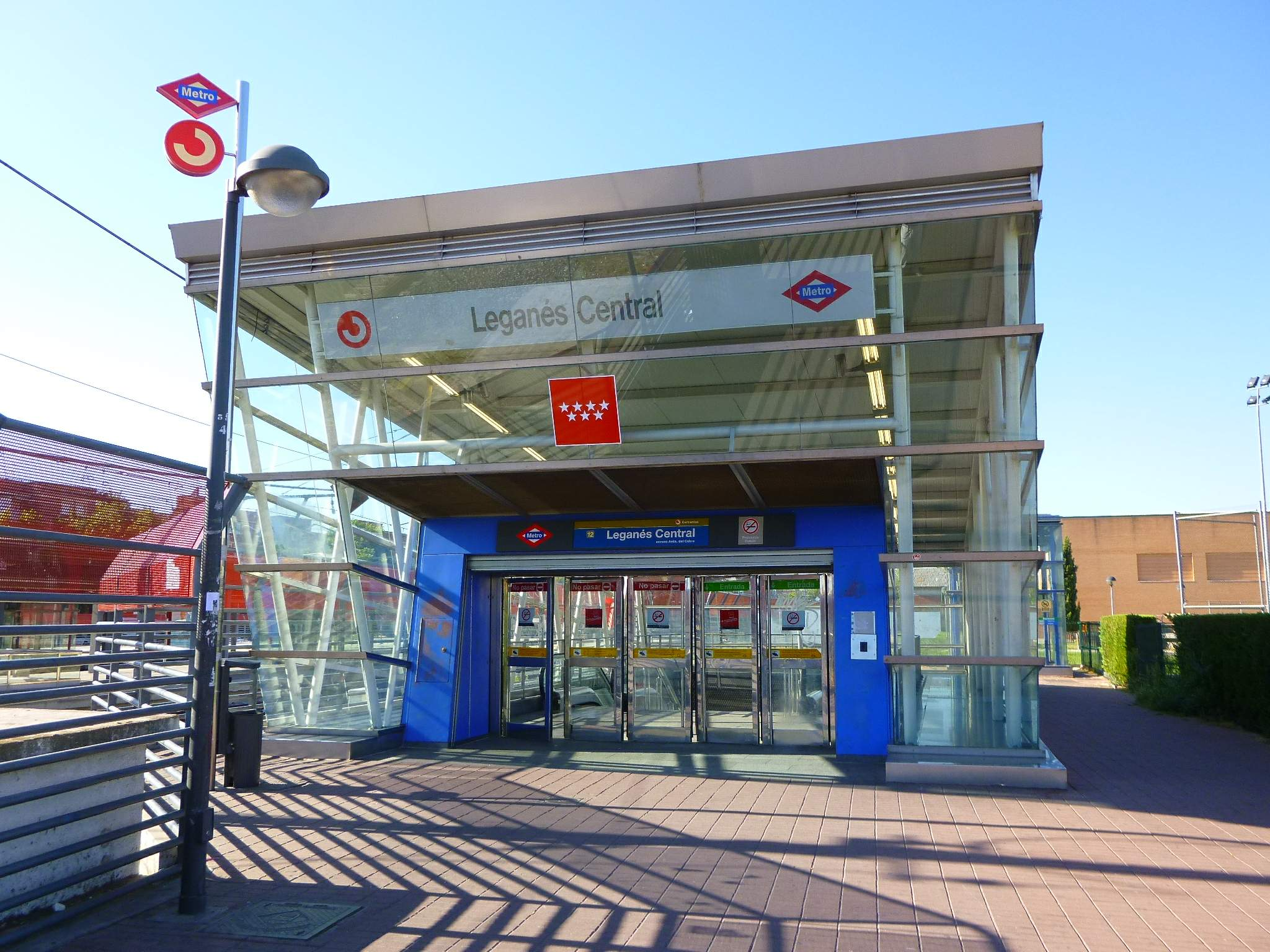
Leganés Central Station

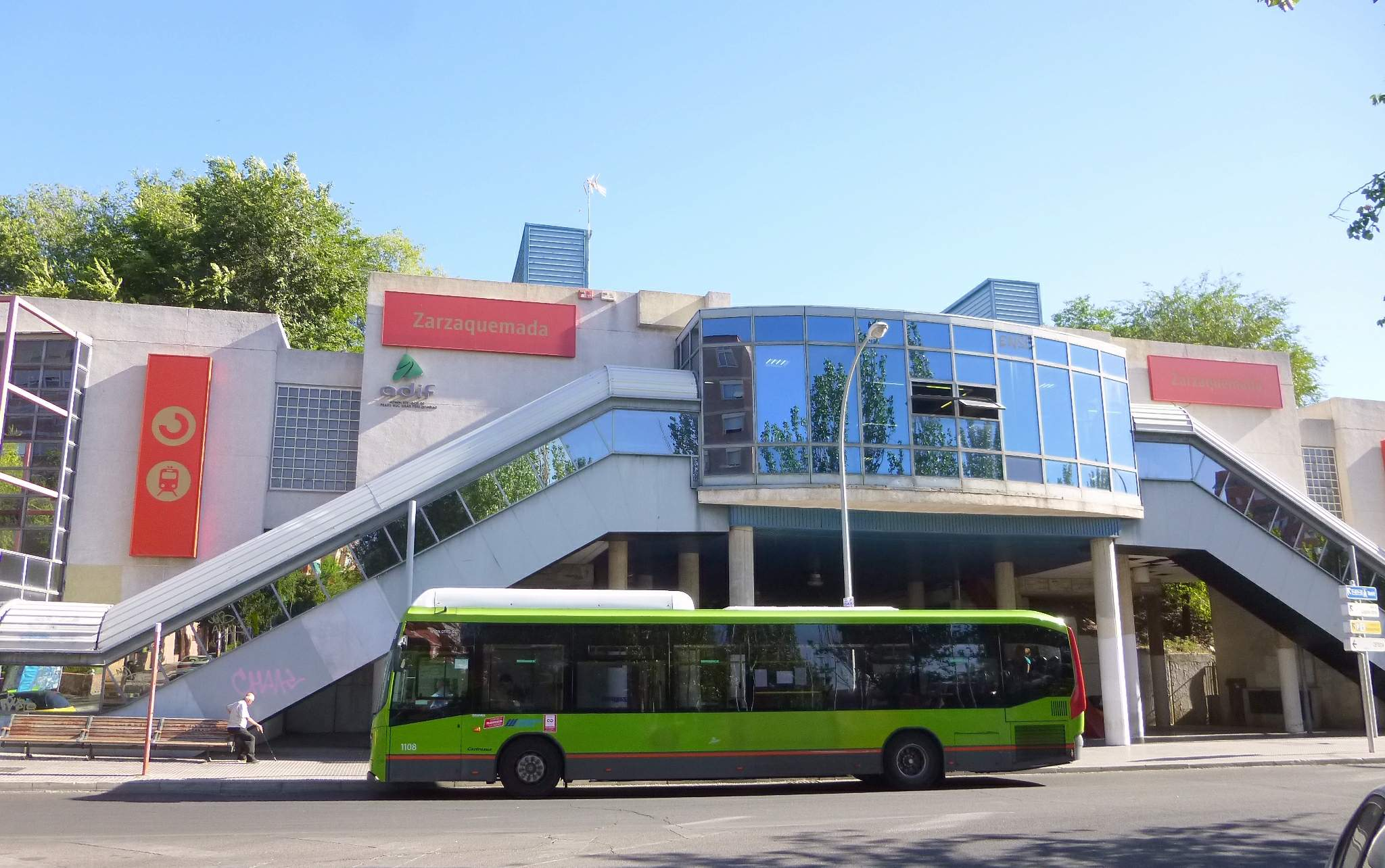
Cercanías station in Zarzaquemada, in the namesake neighborhood, inaugurated on 19 May 1982

The Leganés railway station (Leganés Central) was inaugurated on 20 June 1876, originally used by the now-defunct Madrid to Cáceres and Portugal Railway Company. Located in the city center, it connects to Cercanías Renfe (line C-5), medium-distance trains (Renfe), and Madrid Metro (line 12). A bus stop is located at the station exit.

The railway tracks cross part of the city. Although efforts have been made to reduce their urban impact through walkways and partial burials, the tracks have not been fully undergrounded. A military railway to the Campamento barracks once divided the San Nicasio neighborhood but has been dismantled. The urban track section was removed, and a wide boulevard connecting San Nicasio to Campo de Tiro was built in its place.

Leganés is a stop on the R10 medium-distance railway line (Madrid–Plasencia–Cáceres–Mérida–Badajoz).

For Cercanías Madrid, the commuter rail network connecting Madrid to its metropolitan area, Leganés has three stations on line C-5: Parque Polvoranca (serving Arroyo Culebro and Polvoranca Park), Leganés (city center), and Zarzaquemada (serving Leganés Norte and Zarzaquemada-El Carrascal to the south). Line C-5 connects directly to Atocha (Madrid).

===== Medium distance =====
Line	Trains	Origin/Destination	Destination/Origin
	Intercity	Madrid-Chamartín; Madrid-Atocha Cercanías	Badajoz
	Intercity	Madrid-Atocha Cercanías	Huelva; Zafra
52	MD; RE; Regional	Madrid-Atocha Cercanías	Mérida; Cáceres; Plasencia; Talavera de la Reina

===== Cercanías =====
Line	Route	Stations
C-5	Móstoles-El Soto – Fuenlabrada / Humanes	Parque Polvoranca, Leganés, and Zarzaquemada

==== Metro ====
Leganés has seven Madrid Metro stations: six on line 12 (Metrosur) and one on line 11 for the La Fortuna neighborhood.

Metrosur was inaugurated on 11 April 2003. The six stations in Leganés are San Nicasio, Leganés Central (with Cercanías Renfe connections), Hospital Severo Ochoa, Casa del Reloj, Julián Besteiro, and El Carrascal.

The San Nicasio station is four minutes from Puerta del Sur in Alcorcón, the only connection between Metrosur and line 10. Space was reserved for a station (Poza del Agua) in the namesake neighborhood, to be opened once fully populated, but its inauguration is not currently planned.

The La Fortuna Station was inaugurated on 5 October 2010, connecting the neighborhood to line 11. It does not connect to line 12.

Line	Route	Stations
11	La Fortuna – Plaza Elíptica	La Fortuna
12	Metrosur	San Nicasio, Leganés Central, Hospital Severo Ochoa, Casa del Reloj, Julián Besteiro, El Carrascal

== Culture ==
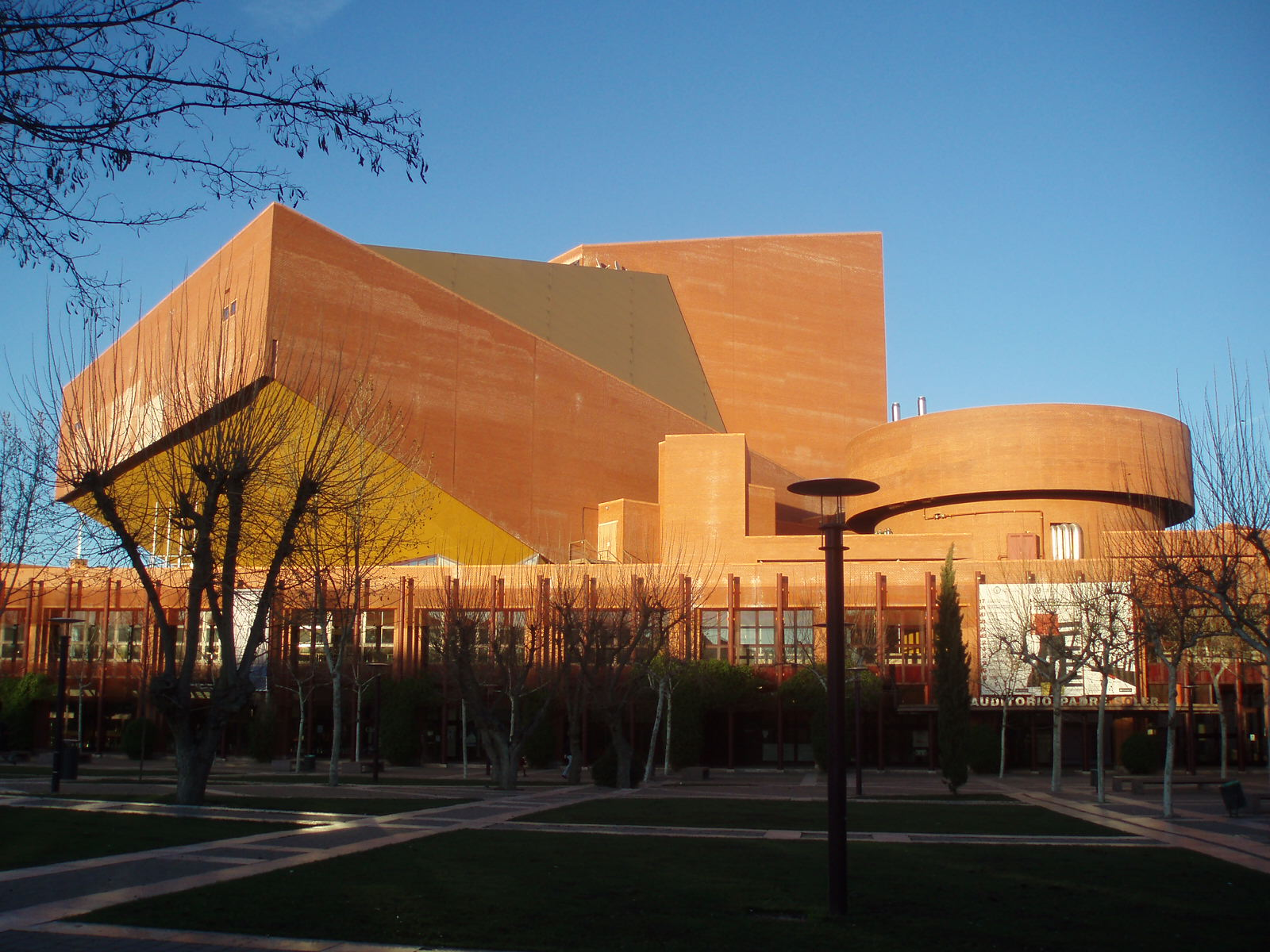
Padre Soler Auditorium, on the Charles III University campus

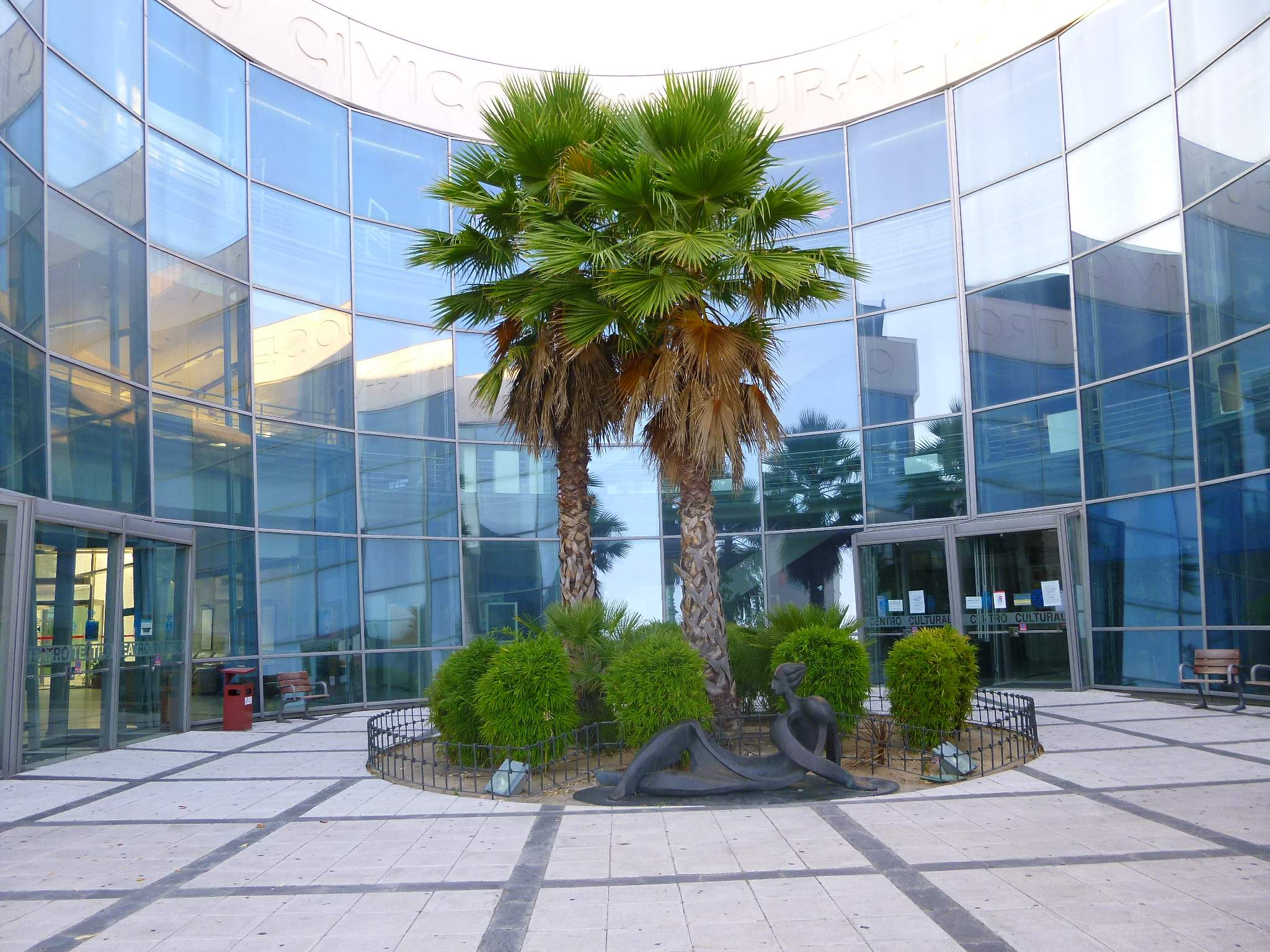
José Saramago Cultural Civic Center, inaugurated in 2005

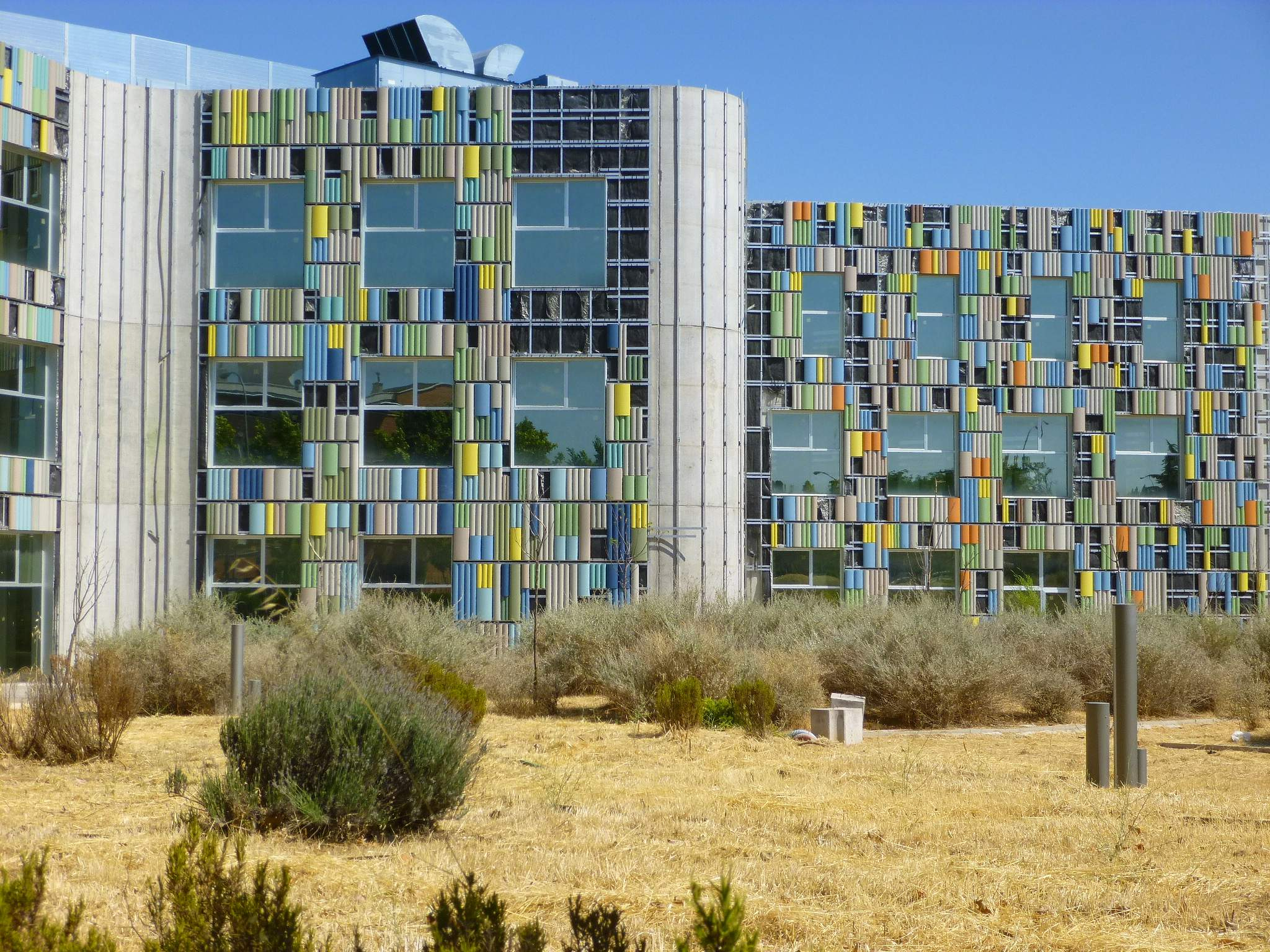
Leganés Central Library and Municipal Archive, in the Leganés Norte neighborhood

Leganés has several cultural facilities for various activities. It features an open-air theater, Egaleo, and six cultural centers. The most recent is the José Saramago Civic Center, located near Campo de Tiro, which includes the José Monleón Theater, an exhibition hall, and a library. The Padre Soler Auditorium is also located in the city, within the Charles III University of Madrid. The Central Library and Municipal Archive are situated in the Leganés Norte neighborhood.

One of Leganés's most iconic buildings is its bullring, La Cubierta, named for its retractable roof. Originally designed for bullfights, it is more commonly used for music concerts, having hosted Festimad twice. It is also a major nightlife area. The city's fairgrounds are located on the same site.

The main museum in Leganés is the Open-Air Sculpture Museum in Las Dehesillas Park. It features sculptures by artists such as Jorge Oteiza, Martín Chirino, Agustín Ibarrola, Ricardo Ugarte, and Victorio Macho, among others. Beyond the museum, the city has additional sculptures displayed throughout its streets.

=== Local festivals ===
The city’s largest celebration occurs on 16 August, dedicated to Our Lady of Butarque, the city's patron saint. The festivities last a week, with events organized by the City Council (such as concerts, fairs, bull runs, and orchestras) complemented by activities hosted by local associations. The next most significant celebration is on 11 October for Saint Nicasius, organized by the City Council and the San Nicasio Neighborhood Association, with similar activities focused on the neighborhood.

Other neighborhoods also hold festivals. La Fortuna celebrates Saint Fortunatus in the last week of June, while Zarzaquemada, Leganés Norte, El Carrascal, and Vereda de los Estudiantes organize events during the week of Saint John's Eve.

=== Sports ===
Sports facilities

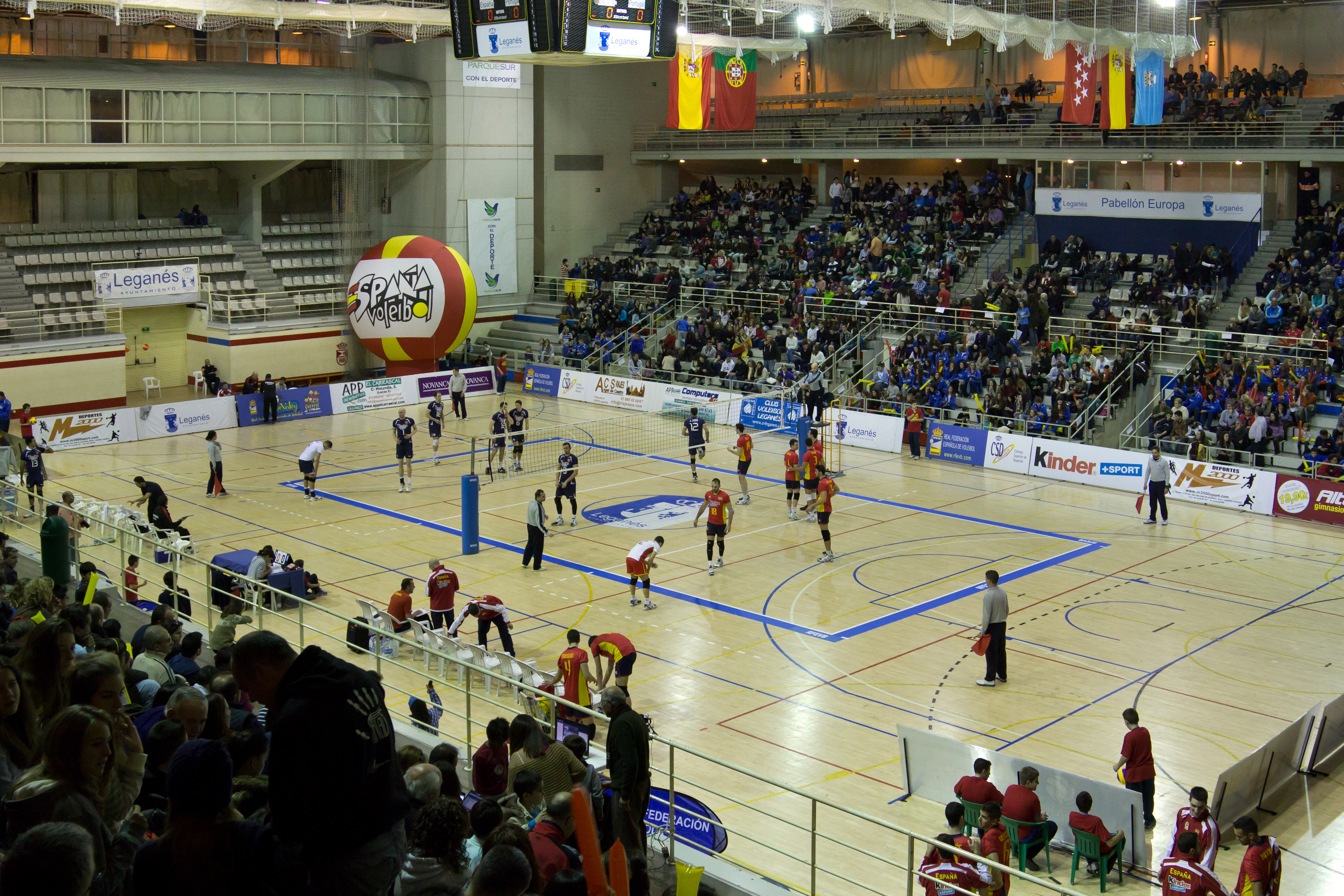
Volleyball match at the Pabellón Europa, between Spain and Portugal

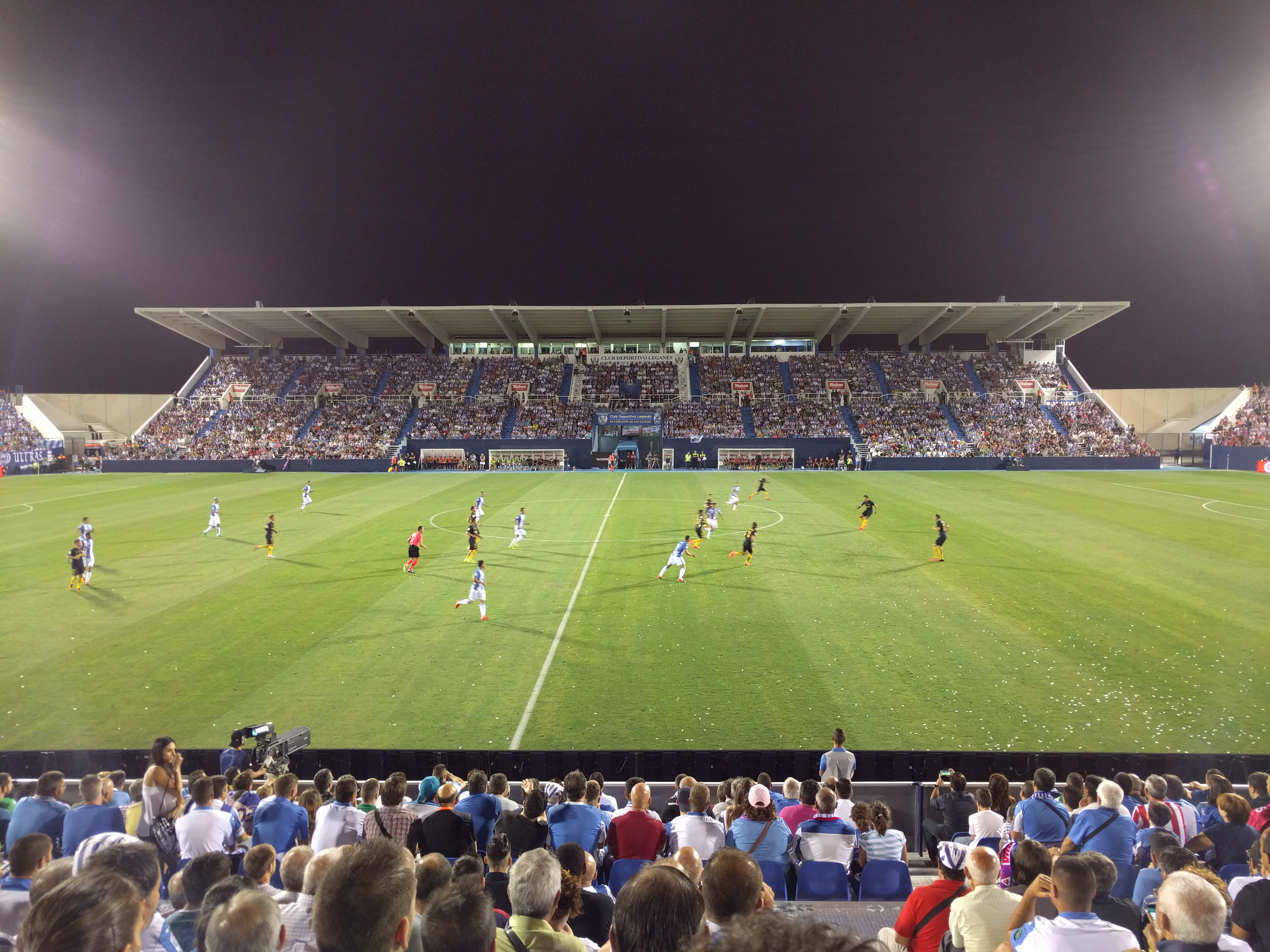
Match between C.D. Leganés and Atlético Madrid at the Butarque Municipal Stadium (2016)

Most sports facilities in Leganés are municipally managed. The Sports Delegation, under the City Council, oversees planning competitions, leasing sports venues, maintenance, and rentals for other events. The city has a football field, a multipurpose pavilion, four sports centers (some with indoor pools), ten sports complexes, and a summer pool in El Carrascal.

The Butarque Municipal Stadium is the largest football field, used by CD Leganés, which maintains it. With a capacity of 11,454 spectators, natural grass, and dimensions of 105 by 70 meters, it was inaugurated on 14 February 1998, replacing the former Luis Rodríguez de Miguel Stadium, on whose site the current Plaza Mayor was built. An adjacent artificial turf field is used for reserve team matches and other local clubs. The team has requested a dedicated sports centre from the City Council for natural grass training, but the project is stalled.

The Pabellón Europa, inaugurated on 20 May 1994, is the main multipurpose center, with a 1,800-square-meter central court surrounded by stands seating 5,000 spectators. It includes multipurpose rooms for martial arts, gyms, squash courts, and a climbing wall. Nearby are the El Carrascal sports complex (the only one with an athletics track) and the Leganés Ice Rink. Due to its capacity, Pabellón Europa is preferred for major sports events, while non-professional clubs use smaller venues such as the Manolo Cadenas, Olimpia, and La Fortuna sports complexes.

Non-municipal facilities include the sports center at the Charles III University of Madrid campus.

Sports clubs

The City Council supports local clubs through annual collaboration agreements and subsidies for non-profit entities.

Football is the most practiced sport in Leganés, in its traditional, women's football, and futsal variants. With nearly 5,000 registered players and 230 teams in local and federated competitions, Leganés is one of the region's top municipalities for football clubs. The most prominent club is CD Leganés, playing in the Second Division in the 2025/6 season, having played four seasons in the top tier.

The city has excelled in other sports, both individual and team-based, with a strong focus on grassroots development. In handball, the main team is Club Balonmano Leganés, competing in Primera Nacional. In volleyball, Club Voleibol Leganés has teams in Liga Iberdrola and Superliga Masculina 2. In basketball, Club Baloncesto Leganés has a team in the women's second division. In martial arts, the Sánchez Élez-Sanabria Sports Club excels in taekwondo, and the Víctor Pradera Club in karate and judo. In swimming, the Club Natación Leganés stands out.

The Leganés Sports Association for Integration (ADIL) is the main sports entity for people with disabilities.

Famous athletes

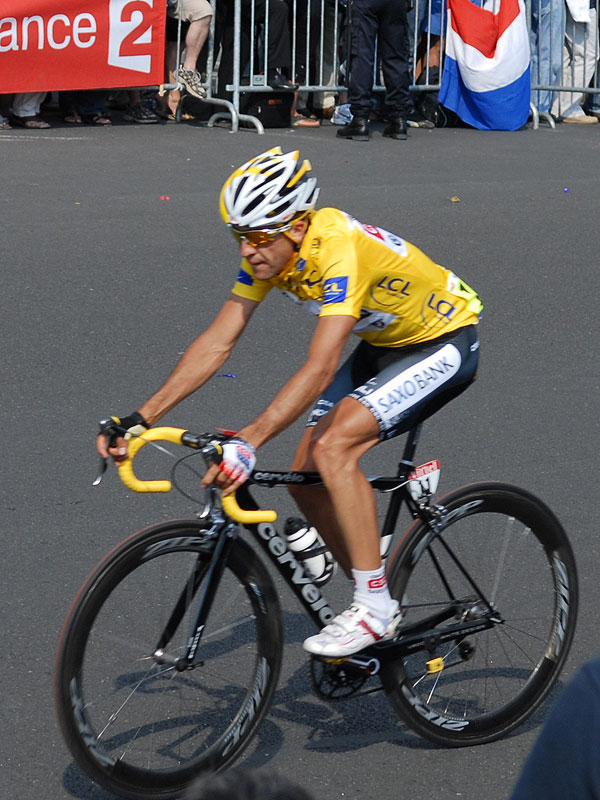
Carlos Sastre with the yellow jersey of the 2008 Tour de France

Several successful Spanish athletes are linked to Leganés. The first Olympic representative was cyclist Daniel Yuste, who competed in the 1968 Mexico City Olympics. Twenty years later, Leganés natives José María Sánchez Élez and José Sanabria won silver medals in taekwondo at the 1988 Seoul Olympics, when the sport was a demonstration event. Diver Javier Illana García competed in 2008 Beijing Olympics and won a bronze medal in diving at the 2010 European Aquatics Championships. Local taekwondists Eva Calvo (Spain's representative at the 2016 Rio de Janeiro Olympics) and her sister Marta Calvo are also from Leganés.

Cyclist Carlos Sastre, winner of the 2008 Tour de France, was born and lived in Leganés until age 18, when he moved to El Barraco (Ávila). Another prominent athlete is José Manuel Egea, a three-time world karate champion with over 14 European and 20 world titles in the 1980s. In handball, Juan Pedro Muñoz "Papitu", Juan del Arco, and Manolo Cadenas began their careers at local clubs. In boxing, Alfonso Redondo was the European welterweight champion in 1987.

Notable footballers include José María Movilla, Juan Sabas, José Luis Pérez Caminero (Atlético Madrid), Vivar Dorado (Leganés and Getafe), Víctor Fernández, Carlos Vigaray, and Dani Carvajal (Real Madrid).

Although not born in Leganés, figure skater Javier Fernández, the 2015 world champion, has been a member of the Club Ice Leganés for figure skating for several seasons.

=== Sister cities ===
Leganés actively participates in sister city initiatives to foster mutual collaboration and cultural exchange. On 19 October 1980, it signed its first agreement with Aigaleo, in the Attica region (Greece). It currently maintains the following sister city relationships, listed by year of establishment:

- Aigaleo, Greece (1980)
- Somoto, Nicaragua (1986)
- Arroyo Naranjo, Cuba (1993)
- Conchalí, Chile (1996)
- (Western Sahara) La Güera, Sahrawi refugee camps (2001)
- Bethlehem, Palestine (2006)
- Macará, Ecuador (2007)

Additionally, it has agreements with Huzhou (China), Targuist (Morocco), and Tindouf (Algeria).

== Bibliography ==
- Corella Suárez, Pilar (1976). Leganés, su arte e historia: (homenaje a Josep de Churriguera) [Leganés, its art and history: (homage to Josep de Churriguera)]. Ed. Raycar. ISBN 978-84-500-7418-5.
- Maroto García, Mariano (2007). Leganés, de aldea a gran ciudad [Leganés, from village to great city]. Leganés: Leganés City Council. Depósito Legal: M-21287-2007.
- Various authors (1994). Leganés, una ciudad para todos [Leganés, a city for everyone]. Leganés: Leganés City Council.
- Various authors (1994). Leganés; una ciudad, una historia [Leganés; one city, one history]. Leganés: Leganés City Council. ISBN 84-87019-12-9.
