= List of pre-college music schools =

Notable pre-college music schools include:

== Austria ==
- Mozarteum University of Salzburg

== Australia ==
- Conservatorium High School

== Canada ==
- Lambda School of Music and Fine Arts

== France ==
- Conservatoire National de Région de Paris
- Maîtrise Notre Dame de Paris

== Germany ==
- Dr. Hoch's Konservatorium - Musikakademie, Frankfurt am Main (Pre-College-Frankfurt)
- Hochschule für Musik Köln, Cologne (Pre-College-Cologne)
- Hochschule für Musik Karlsruhe
- Hochschule für Musik und Darstellende Kunst Mannheim
- Sächsisches Landesgymnasium für Musik "Carl Maria von Weber"

== Hong Kong ==
- The Hong Kong Academy for Performing Arts Junior Music Programme

== India ==
- Calcutta School of Music
- Delhi School of Music
- Akhil Bharatiya Gandharva Mahavidyalaya Mandal
- Eastern Fare Music Foundation
- KM Music Conservatory

== Russia ==
- Gnessin State Musical College

== Spain ==
- Conservatorio Profesional de Música, Getafe, Madrid

== Thailand ==
- College of Music, Mahidol University

== Ukraine ==
- Dnipropetrovsk Academy of Music
- Kyiv Conservatory
- Kyiv Lysenko State Music Lyceum
- Lviv Conservatory
- Lysenko music school
- Odesa Conservatory
- R. Glier Kyiv Institute of Music
- School of Stolyarsky

== United Kingdom ==
=== England ===
- Chetham's School of Music
- Derby School of Music
- Purcell School
- Wells Cathedral School
- Yehudi Menuhin School

=== Scotland ===
- St. Mary's Music School

== United States ==
- Berklee College of Music
- Blair School of Music, Vanderbilt University
- Cleveland Institute of Music Young Artist/Junior Young Artist Program
- Colburn School Music Academy
- The Hartt Community Division
- Hochstein School of Music & Dance
- Idyllwild Arts Academy
- InterHarmony International School of Music Online
- Interlochen Arts Academy
- Juilliard School Pre-College Division
- Manhattan School of Music Precollege Division
- Mannes College The New School for Music
- Midwest Young Artists Conservatory
- Music Academy of the West High School Intensive
- New England Conservatory Preparatory School
- Peabody Institute Preparatory Division
- San Francisco Conservatory of Music Pre-College Division
- Third Street Music School Settlement
- High School of the University of North Carolina School of the Arts
- Walnut Hill School
- Stony Brook University Pre-College Division

== Vietnam ==
- Vietnam National Academy of Music

== See also ==
- List of university and college schools of music
