= InterHarmony International School of Music Online =

Online music school

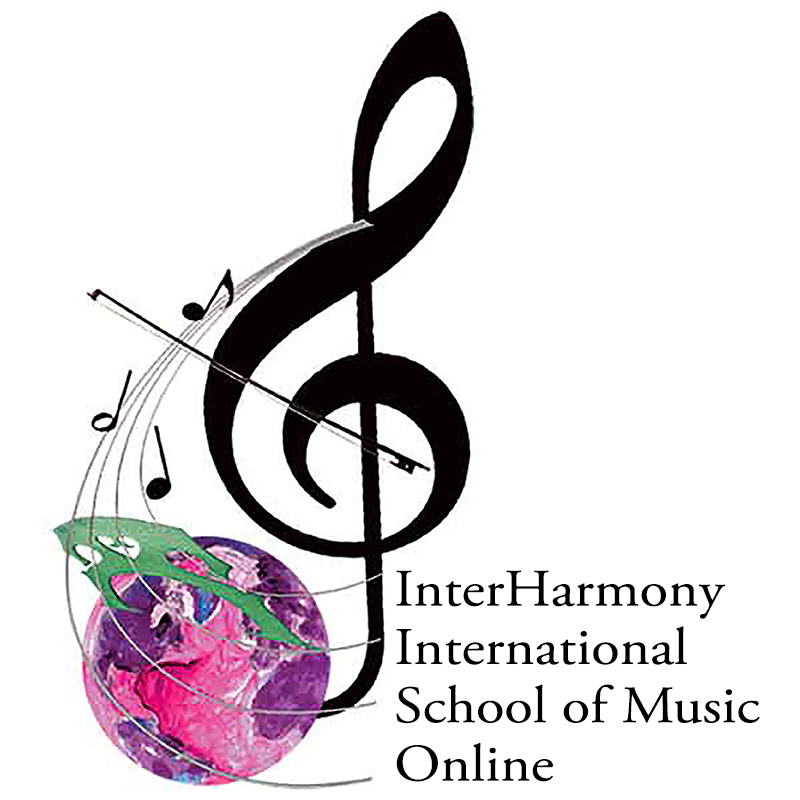

InterHarmony International School of Music is an online classical music conservatory offering year-round classical music training programs, including private lessons on all musical instruments, masterclasses, recitals, classes in music theory, solfège, and other subjects to students of all ages and levels. The program was created by Russian-born, American cello soloist Misha Quint, who also founded the InterHarmony International Music Festival.

Participants of the InterHarmony International School of Music program are automatically accepted to the InterHarmony International Music Festival in Italy and Germany. Virtual students can meet professors in person at the InterHarmony International Music Festival, where they can study in person. Students gain access to masterclasses and workshops, and may submit applications for the Inter Harmony International Competition which has a winner's concert at Weill Recital Hall at Carnegie Hall.

== Program overview ==
InterHarmony International Music Festival, a summer classical music festival, was the inspiration for founding the InterHarmony International School of Music, in order to provide students with the option of studying in full programs without having to leave their homes. The programs allow students from any city or country to receive a balanced and intensive musical education virtually with professors who teach at universities around the world, members of acclaimed orchestras, soloists, and chamber musicians. Students can choose from several different programs, depending on age range. In 2022, the school began offering digital credentials through Credly.

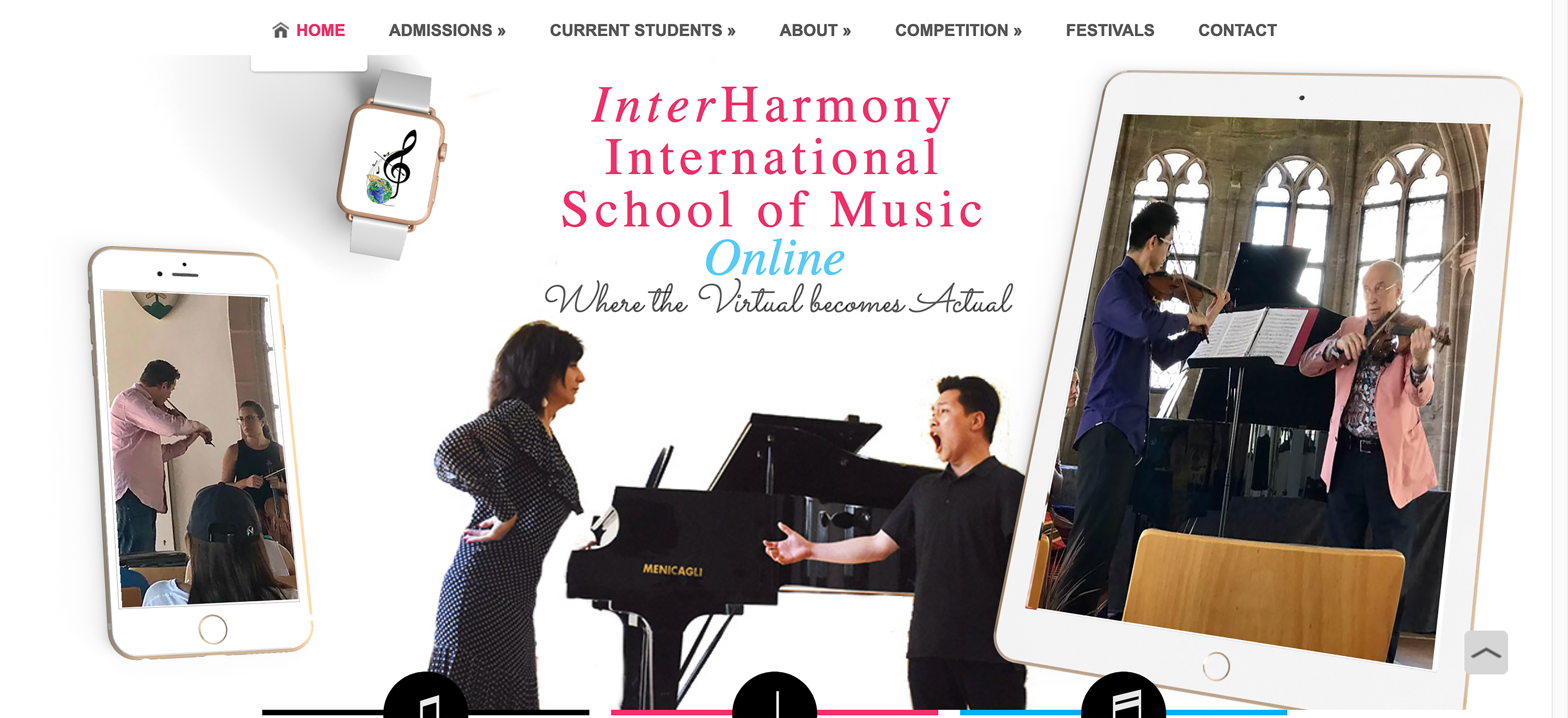
This photo depicts the InterHarmony International School of Music and musicians

== Programs of study ==
InterHarmony International School of Music offers a choice of the following programs of study:

- Precollege Program (Ages 8–13)
- Young Artist Program (Ages 14–17)
- Independent Artist Mastery Program (Ages 18+)
- Music InterMezzo Program (Ages 18+)

=== Instrument programs ===
- Double Bass
- Bassoon
- Cello
- Clarinet
- Composition
- Flute
- French horn
- Guitar
- Oboe
- Piano
- Trumpet
- Trombone
- Tuba
- Viola
- Violin
- Voice

== See also ==
- List of pre-college music schools
- Music schools in the United States
