= Las Margaritas (Madrid) =

Las Margaritas is a neighbourhood of Getafe (Madrid). It is situated in the North-Central zone of the city, next to the centre. It was constructed in the 1970s, and is of a small area, but has many tightly concentrated streets and several squares. Within the neighbourhood is the Las Margaritas Sports Centre, one of the biggest in Getafe, along with several schools and public institutions, and the facilities and student residences of the Universidad Carlos III de Madrid. In addition to bus routes, the area also contains the Las Margaritas station on Line C-4 of Cercanías Madrid, and the closest metro station is Juan de la Cierva.
