= Conservatorio Profesional de Música de Getafe =

Public institution for pre-college education in music

Coordinates: 40.29516°N 3.74246°W

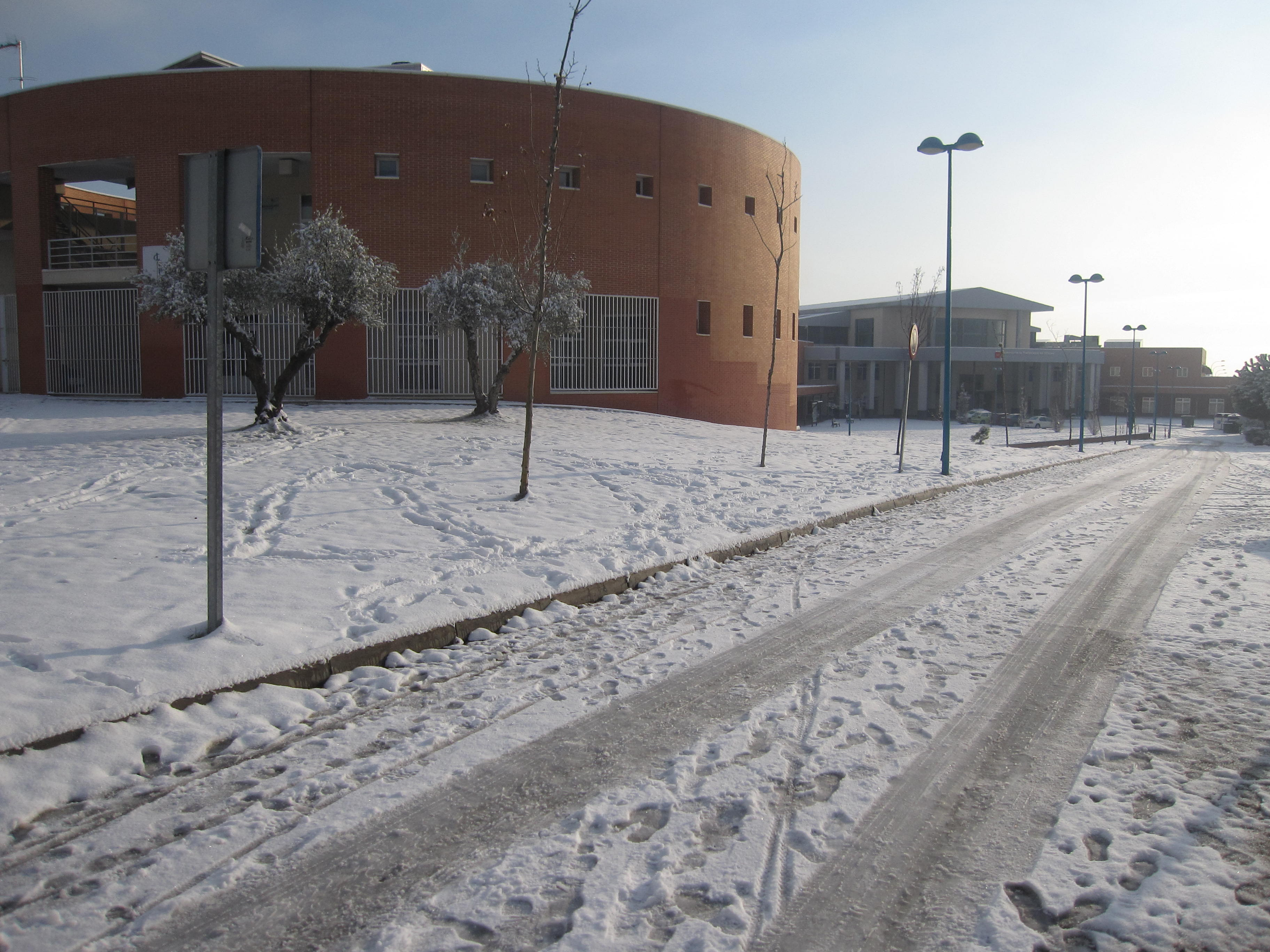
Civic centre and music conservatory of Getafe

The Conservatorio Profesional de Música de Getafe (Getafe Professional Conservatory of Music in English) is a public institution providing specialised pre-college education in Music located in Getafe, Madrid.

== Studies ==
The conservatory offers the LOGSE basic and intermediate levels diplomas in music (Grado Elemental y Medio LOGSE). All the orchestral instruments, guitar, piano, accordion and saxophone are taught. These studies are to be taken alongside highschool studies, in order to obtain a diploma, which allows students to progress to a music college without having to pass theory, aural, and history entrance exams.

== Facilities ==
The conservatory has 49 teaching rooms and 18 practice rooms, library, computer room, large rooms for rehearsals and a 429-seats auditorium.
