= Cerro de los Ángeles =

Hill in Getafe, Spain

Coordinates: 40.3086°N 3.68444°W

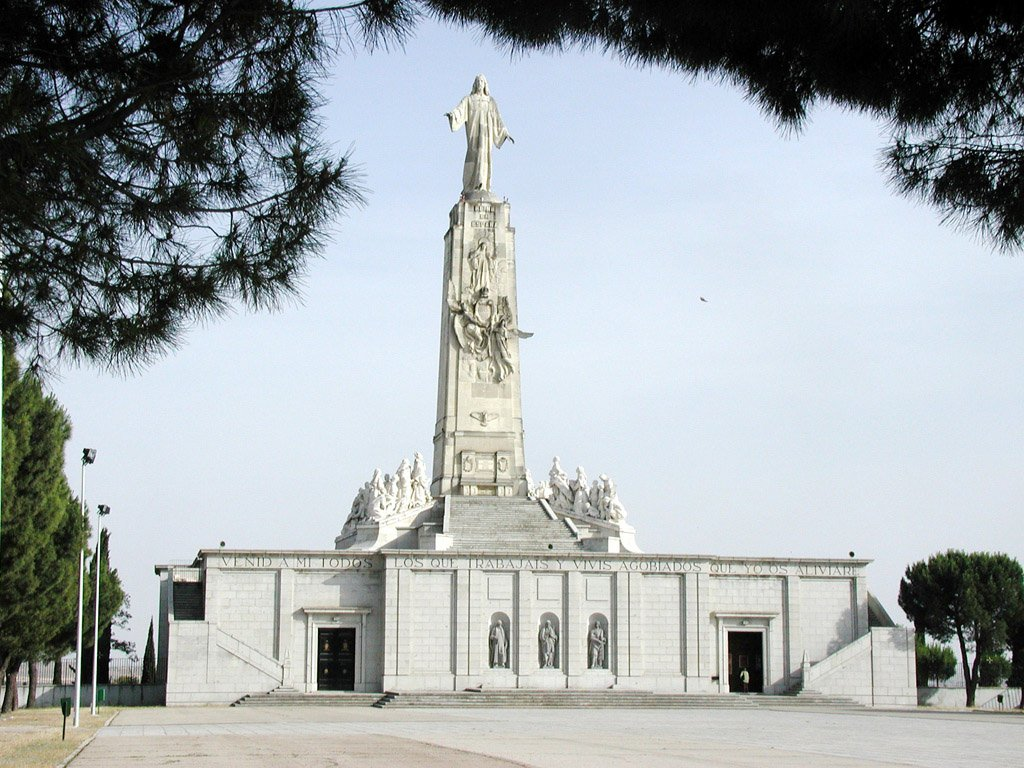
The monument built after the Spanish Civil War encloses a church within its base.

The Cerro de los Ángeles (Hill of the Angels) is a hill located in Getafe, Spain, about 10 km (6.2 mi) south of Madrid. The site is famous for being the geographic centre of the Iberian Peninsula. On top of the hill there is a fourteenth-century monastery named Our Lady of the Angels (Nuestra Señora de los Ángeles), as well as the Monument to the Sacred Heart of Jesus (Monumento al Sagrado Corazón), built in 1919 to dedicate the country and inaugurated by king Alfonso XIII.

The original monument was created by architect Carlos Maura Nadal and sculptor Aniceto Marinas y García, and was inaugurated by King Alfonso XIII on 30 May 1919.

Republicans dynamited the monument on 7 August 1936 during the Spanish Civil War, due to its religious and political symbolism. There was a proposal to replace it with a figure representing Liberty or the Republic, but this was not executed due to the war and the defeat of the Republicans.

Bullet marks dating from the war can be seen on the Sagrado Corazón monument as well as the walls of the monastery.

After the war, the Franco government moved the remains of the monument across the esplanade and, funded by popular subscription, rebuilt a bigger version with an underground church.

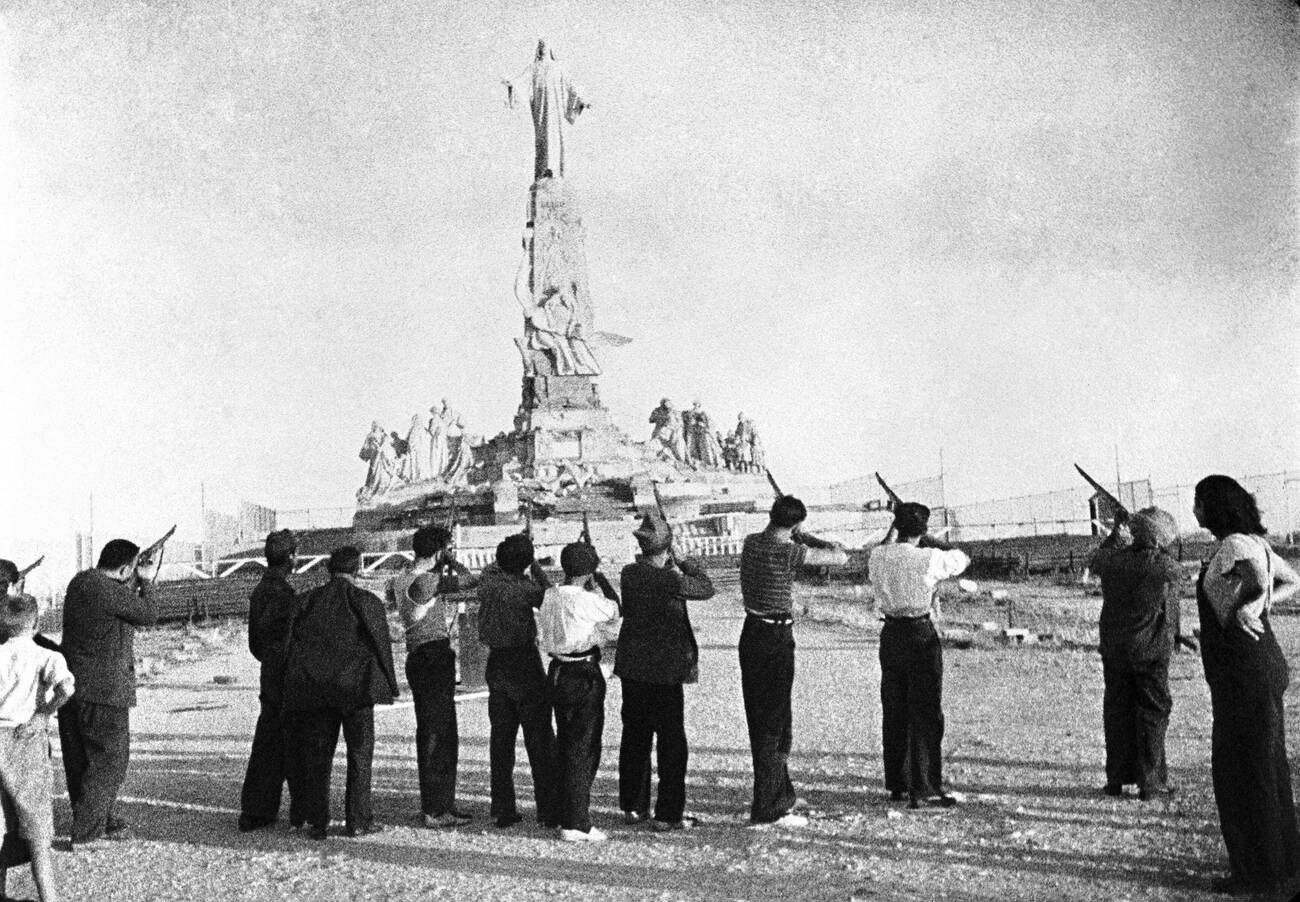
"Execution" of the Cerro de los Ángeles by Communist militiamen in 1936 during the Spanish Civil War. The photograph in the London Daily Mail had the caption "Spanish Reds' war on religion".

The current monument is almost identical in design to the 1919 monument, but on a larger scale. Construction began in 1944 in accordance with designs by the architects Pedro Muguruza and Luis Quijada Martínez. The monument shows Christ with open arms, inviting all men to come to Him. The 11.5 metres (38 ft) high statue on a 26 metres (85 ft) pedestal is the work of Aniceto Marinas, and the group of sculptures around the base is by Fernando Cruz Solís. The monument was opened in 1965. The crypt, which did not exist in the original monument, was opened in 1975.

In the monument resides the patron virgin of Getafe.

The slopes of the hill are populated with maritime pines as well as parks, springs, paths, a bar and soccer grounds.

From the geologic point of view, the hill has a peak altitude of 670 meters (2,200 feet) above sea level, with the base at 610 meters (2,000 feet). The area surrounding the hill is flat in all directions, making for great panoramic views of Madrid, Getafe, and the surrounding countryside.

A radio tower sits on the peak of the hill besides the monastery. The seminary for the diocese of Getafe is located by the monastery.

== See also ==
- Valle de los Caídos
