= Getafe =

- Municipality
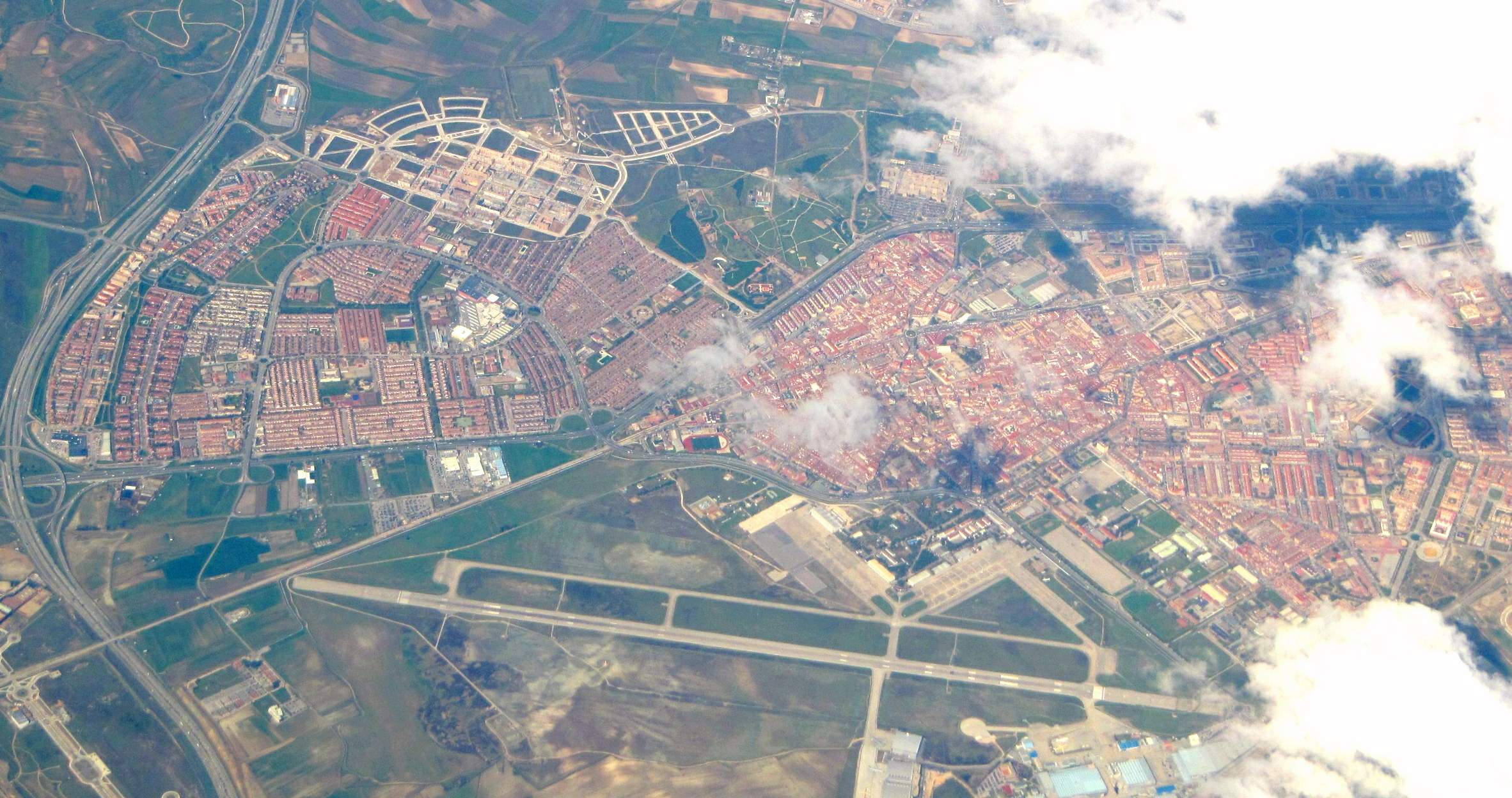

- Flag Coat of arms
- Interactive map of Getafe
- Coordinates: 40°18′17″N 3°43′52″W
- Country: Spain
- Region: Community of Madrid

Government
  - Type: Ayuntamiento
  - Body: Ayuntamiento de Getafe
  - Mayor: Sara Hernández Barroso (2023) (PSOE)

Area
  - Total: 78.74 km^{2} (30.40 sq mi)
- Elevation: 622 m (2,041 ft)
- Highest elevation (Cerro Buenavista): 704 m (2,310 ft)
- Lowest elevation (Manzanares): 540 m (1,770 ft)

Population (2025-01-01)
  - Total: 193,238
  - Density: 2,454/km^{2} (6,356/sq mi)
- Demonym: Getafense
- Time zone: UTC+1 (CET)
  - Summer (DST): UTC+2 (CEST)
- Postal code: 28901–28909
- Dialing code: +34 (ES) + 91 (M)
- Website: Official website

Getafe (Spanish pronunciation: [xeˈtafe]) is a municipality and a city in Spain belonging to the Community of Madrid. As of 2025, it has a population of 193,238, the region's fifth most populated municipality.

Getafe is located 13 km south of Madrid's city centre, within a flat area of central Iberia's Meseta Central in the Manzanares River basin. The Cerro de los Ángeles hill, a site traditionally considered to be the geographical center of the Iberian Peninsula, also lies within the municipal limits.

Getafe was a hamlet attached to the Madrid's sexmo of Villaverde during the late Middle Ages. Its proximity to Madrid fostered industrial development during the 20th and 21st centuries. Industrialisation was followed by an increase in population, reaching 170,115 in 2011. Due to its industrial and social networks, the majority of residents work or study within the city. New neighborhoods were developed towards the end of the 20th century.

Getafe hosts an Airbus factory. It is home to the Getafe Air Base, one of the oldest Spanish military air bases, and to the main campus of the Charles III University of Madrid (UC3M).

== Etymology ==
During the Middle Ages, a number of villages were located in the present-day area of Getafe. One of the main villages was Alarnes, which was very close to the current urban center. In 1326, the villagers united themselves into one town, situated on the royal road that linked Madrid with Toledo. This new town was called Xatafi, a name which came from the Arab word jata ("something long"). It is assumed that the name Xatafi referred to the royal road, which also served as the town's main street. The town's name evolved over time, from Xetafe to Jetafee to Jetaphe to Jetafe to Getafe.

== History ==
The history of Getafe can be split into three clearly defined eras. In the first era, which lasted from Prehistory until 1326, there existed distinct villages in the area, though Getafe itself did not exist as a municipality. The second era lasted from the 14th century until the 20th century, during which Getafe was established as a town and developed slowly. In the third era, which began in the 20th century and continues to the present day, Getafe changed in nature from a small agricultural town to a large industrial city, with a noticeable increase in commerce, industry, population and size.

=== Origins ===
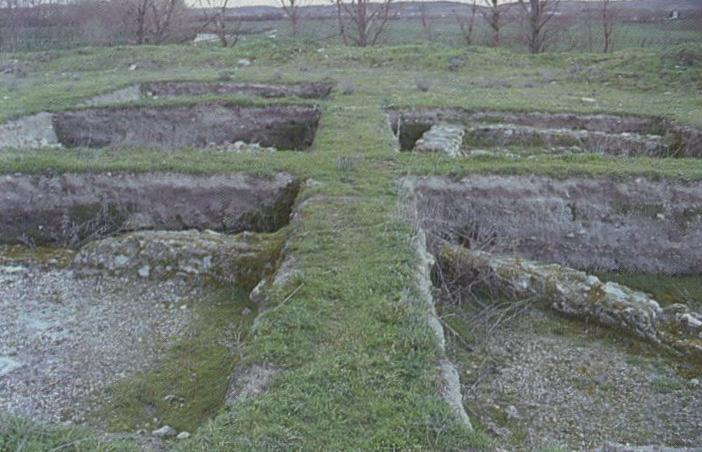
Ruins of the Roman villa of La Torrecilla.

The presence of humans in the area of Getafe dates back to the Lower Paleolithic period (before 100,000 BCE). Various stone tools, pots, and bracelets from this period have been excavated from the banks of the Manzanares River.

In late antiquity, a Roman villa was developed in the site of La Torrecilla within the current-day municipal limits.

Alfonso VI wrestled the area from Muslim control in 1085 in the context of the conquest of the Taifa of Toledo. The placename was early mentioned in 1259. Other medieval settlements in the territory include Alarnes, Acedinos, La Aldehuela, Ayúden, Covanuebles, Perales del Río, and Torre de Iván Crispín. Over the remainder of the Middle Ages, Getafe was a hamlet attached to the sexmo of Villaverde, one of the rural subdivisions of the Land of Madrid. Getafe experienced demographic and economic growth since the mid 15th century, enabling larger degrees of societal complexity and fuelling more intense trade with Madrid. By the end of the century it had a population of around one thousand.

=== Modern history ===
In 1492, famine and disease devastated Getafe, prompting the construction of the Hospitalillo de San José in 1529. In 1549, the architect Alonso de Covarrubias began building the Iglesia de Nuestra Señora de La Magdalena, which has since become the Cathedral of the Diocese of Getafe. The church was built on the foundation of the old hermitage, and in 1610 a new hermitage was built on the Cerro de los Ángeles. The college of the Escuelas Pías was founded in 1737. In 1763, King Charles III ordered the construction of a new road connecting Madrid to Aranjuez and, further on, to Cádiz, which passed along the foot of the Cerro de los Ángeles. Napoleonic troops occupied Getafe from 1808 to 1812. A train line connecting Madrid to Aranjuez, and passing through Getafe, was inaugurated in 1851.

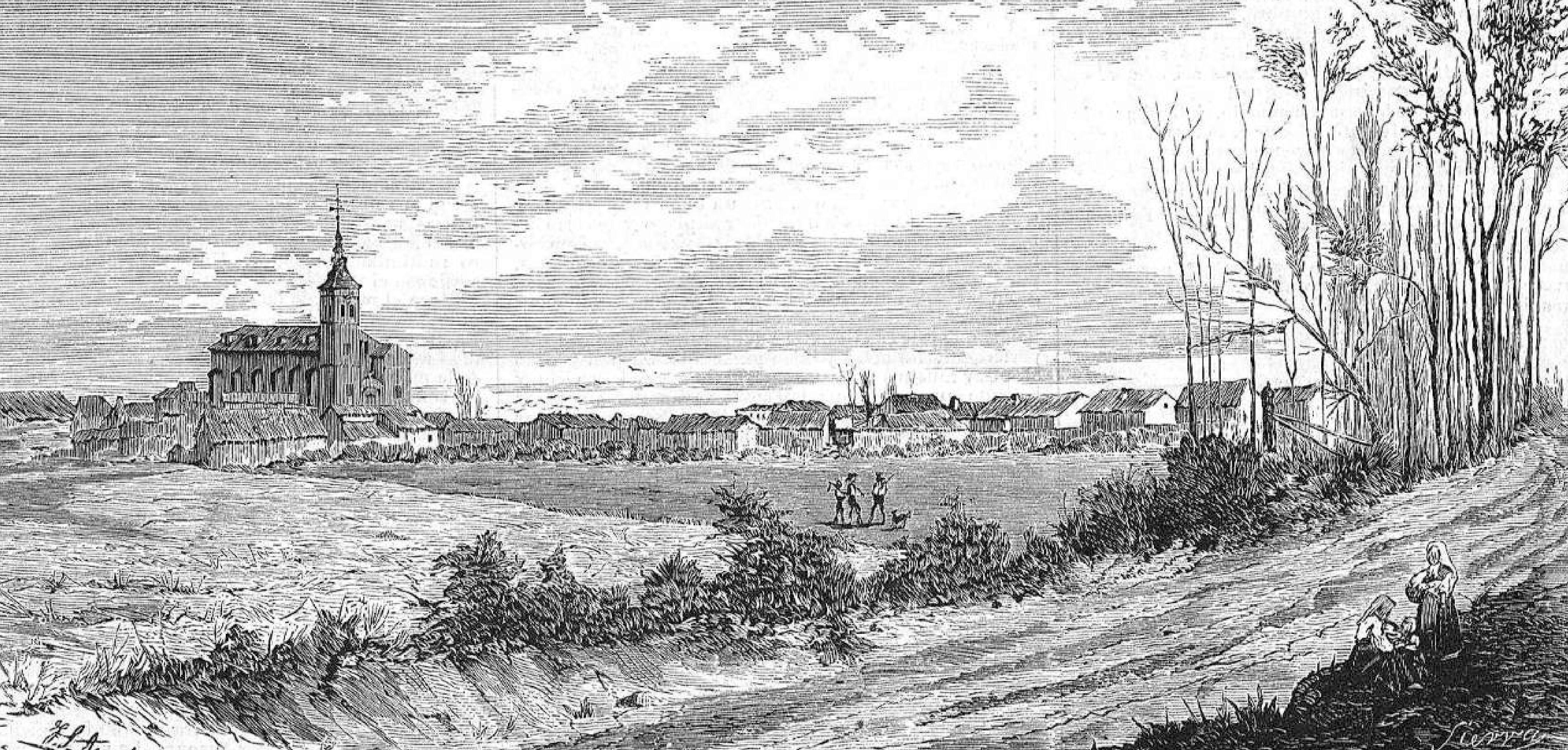
Engraving of Getafe published in 1878 in La Academia: revista de la cultura hispano portuguesa, latino-Americana.

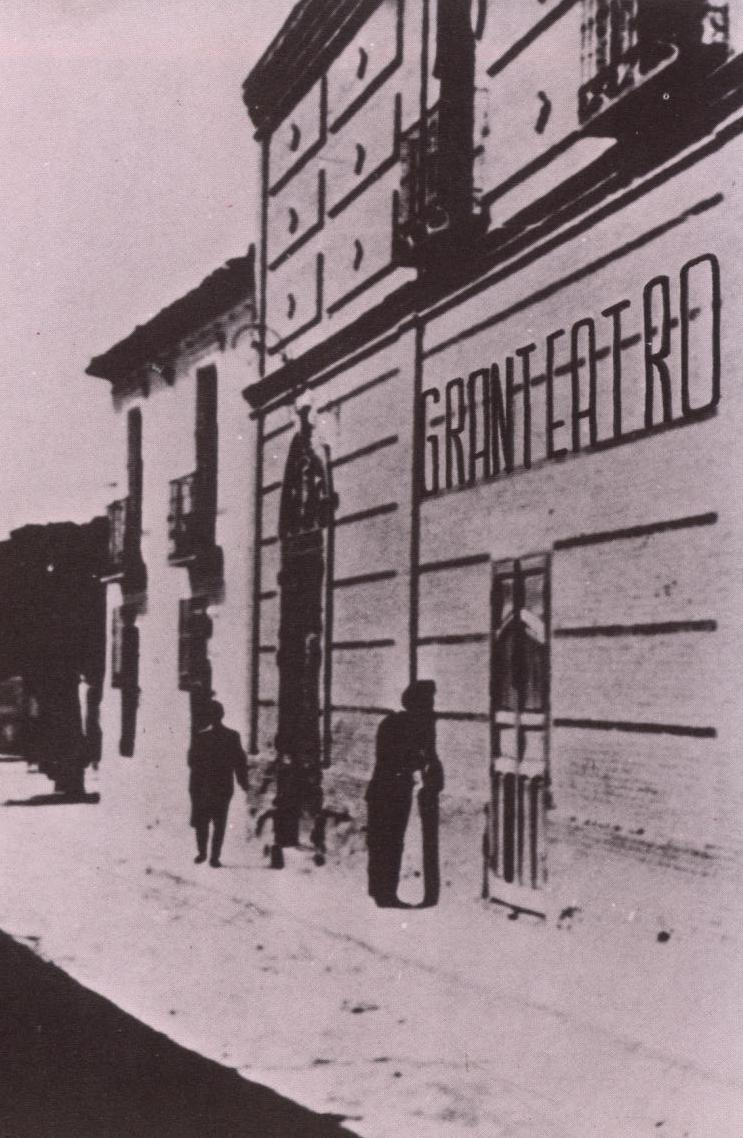
Getafe's Gran Teatro (Great Theater) at the end of the 19th century.

Electric street lights were lit for the first time in Getafe on 22 December 1897. The Getafe Air Force Base was permanently established in 1911, followed by the School of Civil Aviation two years later. King Alfonso XIII inaugurated the first monument to the Sacred Heart of Jesus on the Cerro de los Ángeles on 30 May 1919. In 1924, Construcciones Aeronáuticas S.A. built its first factory in the area. That same year, Juan de la Cierva's autogyro was flown for the first time from the air force base.

Due to its proximity to Madrid, Getafe underwent an industrial revolution at the beginning of the 20th century, resulting in the city's conversion from agricultural city to industrial city. Industrialization also prompted a rapid boom in population, starting in the 1950s. In 1956, John Deere established a factory in Getafe, and a year later, Siemens AG followed suit. The city was forced to create the neighborhoods of San Isidro, El Bercial, Juan de la Cierva, and Las Margaritas in the 1970s in order to support these new industries.

In 1961, the Canal de Isabel II began to provide water to Getafe. The first local democratic elections occurred in 1979, after the ratification of the Constitution in 1978. In 1989, the Universidad Carlos III was founded. The Sector III neighbourhood was constructed between 1979 and 1988; the Getafe Norte neighbourhood was built during the late 1990s; the El Bercial neighbourhood is currently being expanded. In April 2003, Madrid Metro System's Line 12 opened, linking the Madrid region's southern population centres with the capital.

== Heraldry ==
The coat of arms of Getafe is divided vertically into two equal halves that represent the two most important characteristics of the municipal district. The left half contains a heart in the center of a Latin cross, representing the Sacred Heart of Jesus—a reference to the Cerro de los Ángeles. The right half contains a repeated pattern of airplanes representing the aeronautical tradition of the area and referencing the nearby Air Force Base. The Royal Spanish Crown tops the coat of arms, and symbolizes Getafe's loyalty to the Spanish monarchy.

== Politics and government ==
The current mayor of Getafe is Sara Hernández Barroso of the Spanish Socialist Workers' Party, thanks to the support of left wing group United Left (IU) and a political platform close to Podemos called 'Ahora Getafe'. In 2011, Juan Soler-Espiauba Gallo, of the People's Party (PP), was elected mayor and displaced the incumbent, a socialist, who had held this post since 1983. The most popular political parties in the area, other than the PSOE, are the Peoples' Party (PP) and the United Left (IU). Getafe has always had a large working population, and left-wing groups, especially the PSOE, have traditionally been very influential. Getafe is also part of the so-called "red belt" of the Community of Madrid.

In the 2007 Spanish regional elections, the PSOE elected 13 town councillors (44.18% of the vote), PP, 11 (36.09%), and IU 3, (11.73%). Other political associations were not able to muster enough votes to receive representation. Local elections occur every four years, along with the autonomous election.

In the last Spanish General elections celebrated in 2015, PP obtained 25,65% of the vote, very close to Podemos (24,72%) and PSOE (22,60%). Ciudadanos obtained 16,54% of the vote and IU 7,07%.

Cabinet meetings are composed of nine councillors: eight from the PSOE and one from IU. The Municipal Corporation is made up of 27 members, detailed previously. The cabinet is presided over by the mayor. The Getafe city council is divided into a number of different focus groups: treasury, wealth, and social security; equality; urbanism; civil action; and management of waste disposal, cleanliness, the environment, and the home. The council holds sessions every month, in addition to frequently held special sessions, in which councillors debate various topics and problems which affect the municipality.

Getafe is at the forefront of the struggle for workers rights in local industry. The most important trade unions in the city are the Workers' Commissions (CCOO) and the Unión General de Trabajadores (UGT). Both unions have branch offices in Getafe and list many local workers as members.

== Geography ==
=== Physical location ===
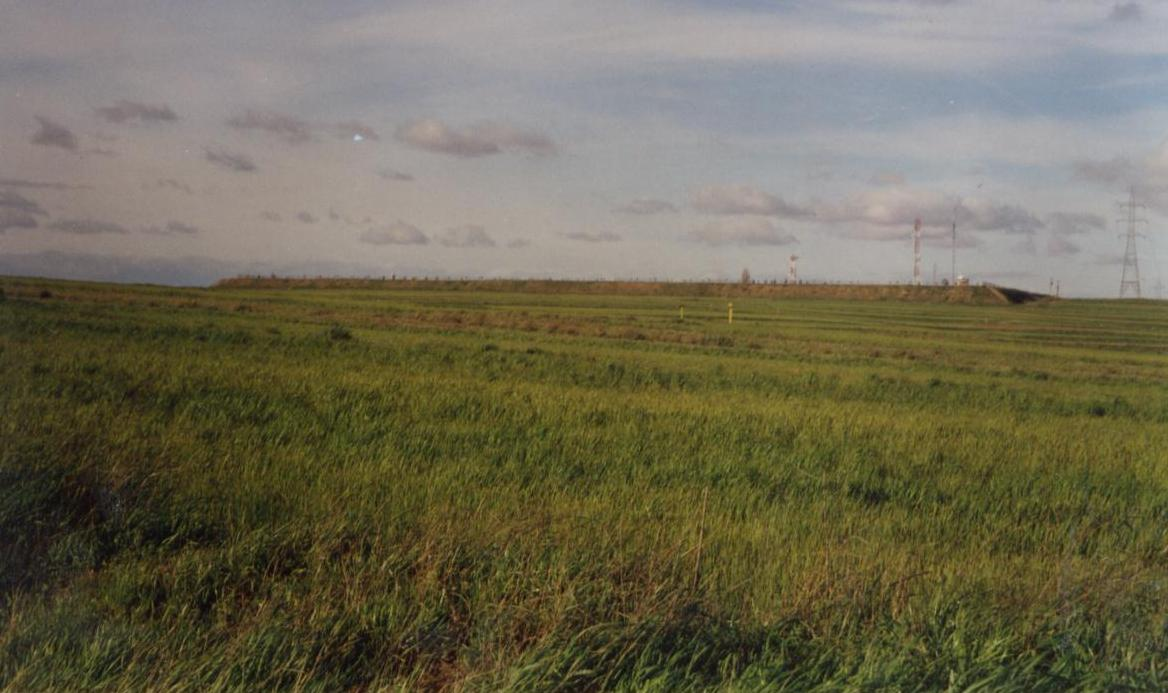
Cerro Buenavista, or Buenavista hill, the area of highest elevation in the Getafe municipality at 704 meters (2309 ft). There is a deposit of water on the summit of the hill from the canal of Isabel II.

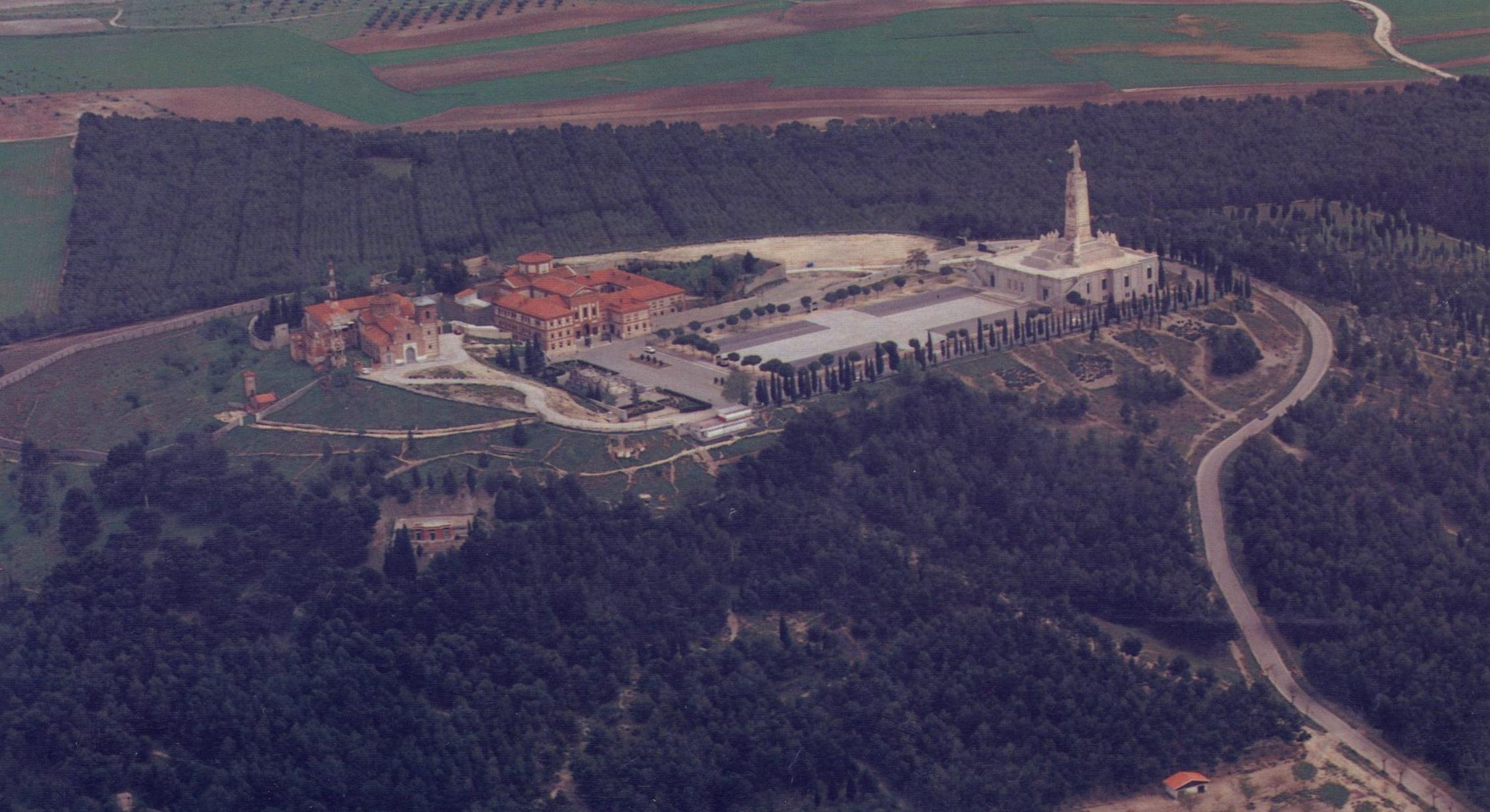
Cerro de los Ángeles

Getafe is located in the southern zone of the autonomous community of Madrid, Spain, in southwestern Europe. It is physically located in the centre of the Iberian Peninsula, north of the Southern Submeseta (part of the Meseta Central), in the Manzanares River basin. Its elevation is 610 – 640 meters above sea level (2000–2100 feet). Its coordinates are 40° 18' N 3° 43' W. The municipal district is 78.74 km^{2}, with a perimeter of 46.5 km. The easternmost part of the municipal district is located within the Parque Regional del Sureste, a protected forest region.

==== Distances ====
Due to its central location within the Iberian Peninsula, Getafe is no more than 725.6 km from any Spanish provincial capital in mainland Spain. The following are the distances to a few major cities, the oceans which surround the Spanish coasts, and the national borders of Portugal and France.

- Puerta del Sol of Madrid: 13 km
- Toledo: 59 km (capital of the nearest province other than Madrid)
- Girona: 725,6 km (capital of the furthest province on the mainland)
- Center of Leganés (adjacent municipality): 4,3 km
- Fuenlabrada (adjacent municipality): 7,5 km
- Parla (adjacent municipality): 8 km

- Mediterranean Sea (Valencia): 348 km
- Bay of Biscay (Santander): 398 km
- Atlantic Ocean (Cádiz): 640 km
- Portuguese Border: 402 km
- French Border: 510 km

=== Relief ===
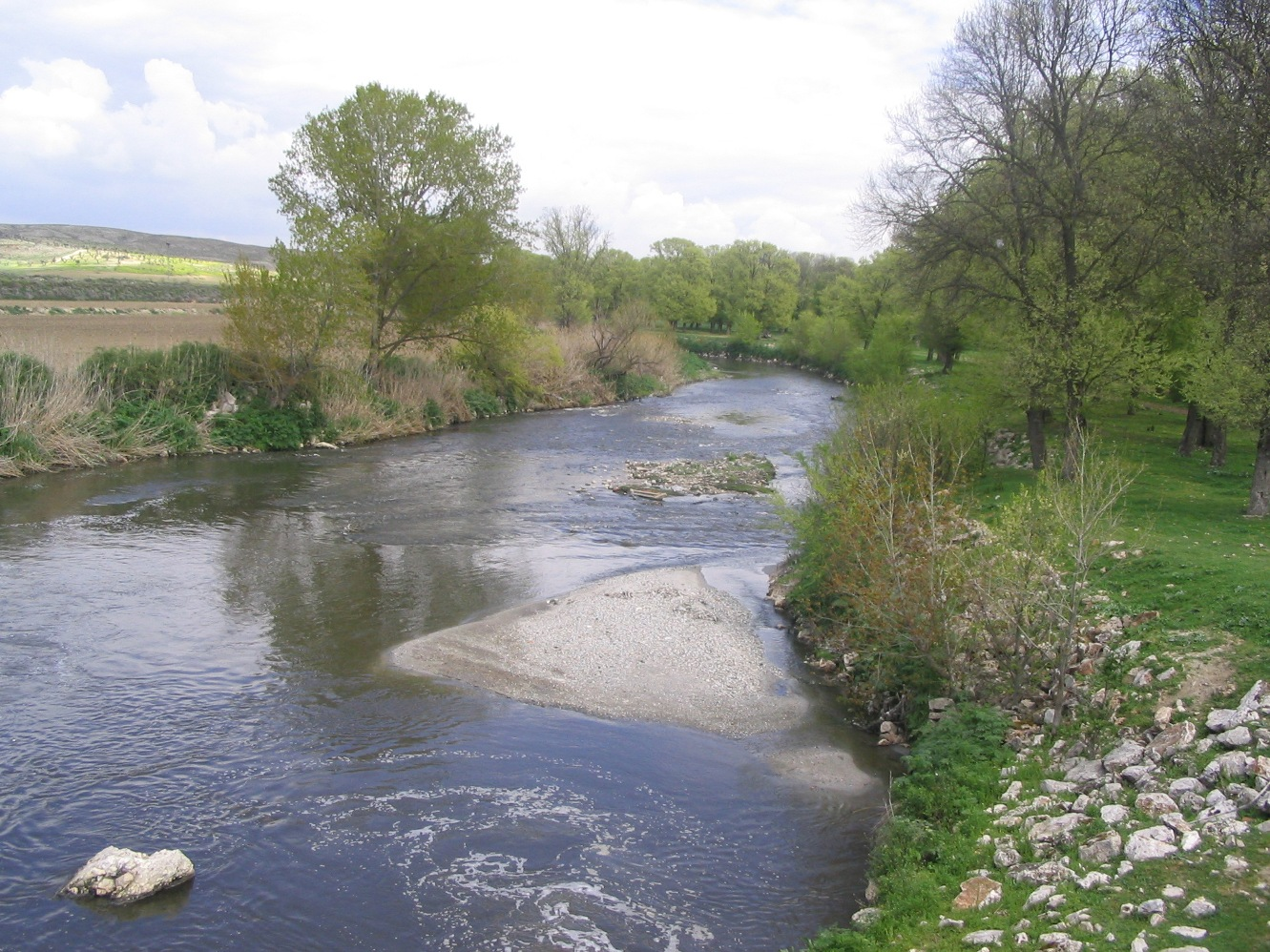
The bank of the Manzanares River.

The municipal district is mostly flat, with a minor inclination of 5% to the east and an elevation of 631 m (2070 ft) above sea level. The lowest altitude can be found to the extreme east, at the Manzanares River at 540 m (1772 ft). The highest elevation is found on the extreme west, on Buenavista, a 704 m (2310 ft) hill which sits on the border between the municipalities of Getafe and Leganés, some 12 km South of Madrid. The hilliest area, the hills of the Marañosa, is located in the Southeast and has a maximum elevation of 698 m (2290 ft). In the center of Getafe is the Cerro de los Ángeles, or hill of angels (670 m; 2198 ft). Pine forests have been planted at the feet of these hills to deter the erosion of the soil.

=== Hydrology ===
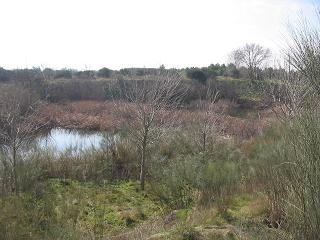
Lakes of Perales. Because so few remain, these four small lakes are protected.

A number of rivers and other natural waterways pass through Getafe. 9.5 km of the Manzanares River passes through the easternmost parts of the municipal district. In the South, 16.5 km of the Culebro Waterway winds its way across Getafe, and in the Southeast 2 km of the Filipinas gully descent from the hills of the Marañosa. There are two man-made canals, one on each side of the Manzanares River. These parallel canals provide water for cultivated land further from the river.

The lakes of Perals are 2 km East of the Cerro de los Ángeles, and are some of the only undisturbed natural lakes left in the region. For this reason, the lakes are part of a protected area to preserve their natural state.

The Culebra waterway and the Filipinas gully boast heavy water flow during the winter and little to none during the summer. In contrast, the Manzanares carries water year round. For that reason, Getafe is considered to be within the Manzanares river basin, except for a small portion in the southeast which is part of the Jarama river basin.

=== Borders ===
The city of Getafe borders the following municipalities: to the north, Madrid (city districts Villaverde and Vallecas); to the east, Rivas Vaciamadrid; to the southeast, San Martín de la Vega; to the south, Pinto; to the southwest, Fuenlabrada; to the west, Leganés.

| NW: Leganés | N: Villaverde | NE: Vallecas |
| W: Leganés | Getafe | E: Rivas-Vaciamadrid |
| SW Fuenlabrada | S: Pinto | SE: San Martín de la Vega |

=== Climate ===
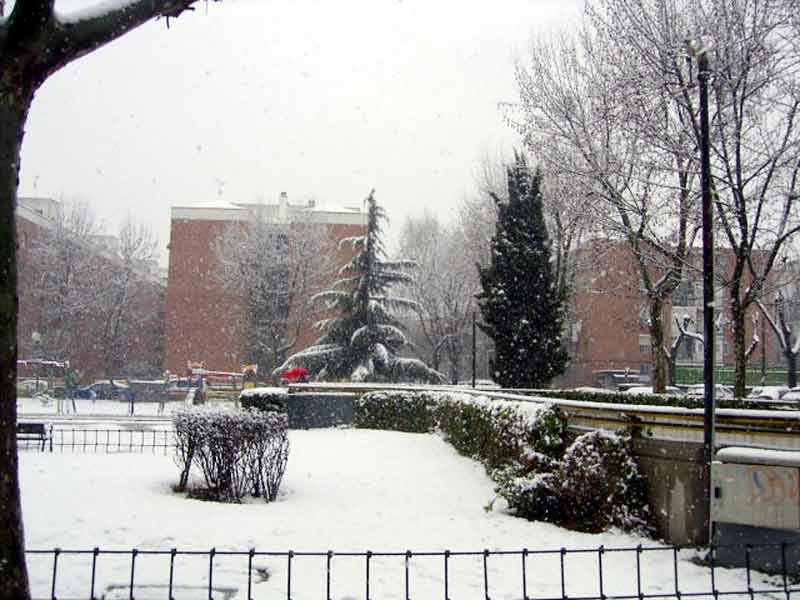
A park in Getafe on a snowy day.

The climate of Getafe is cold semi-arid (Köppen climate classification: BSk). Winters are cool, with temperatures dropping below 10 °C (46.4 °F) during the day, and frequently below 2 °C (32 °F) at night. Getafe averages three to four snowfalls per year. Summers are very hot, with median temperatures above 26 °C (79 °F) in July and August, and with maximum temperatures which often reach 35 °C (95 °F). Daily temperatures oscillate within range of 10 °C (18 °F).

Precipitations are regularly distributed throughout the year, excluding the dry summer months. The rainiest month is October, with 54 millimetres (2.1 in) of rainfall, and the driest month is July, with only 6 millimetres (0.24 in). Average yearly precipitation is around 354 millimetres (13.9 in).

One of the major problems of Getafe's climate is air pollution, which increases noticeably when the wind blows South or Southeast. The average annual temperature is 15 °C, with the highest temperature on record listed at 41.6 °C (106.8 °F) on 24 July 1995, and the lowest temperature recorded at -12 °C (10.4 °F) on 5 February 1963. The average relative humidity is 56%, average pressure is 1,015.8 millibars, average number of daylight hours per year is 2,921, and the winds blow predominantly from the northeast.

Extreme weather conditions, such as hurricanes, floods, earthquakes, and tornadoes, never occur in Getafe thanks to its climate and geography. One common problem in the interior of the Iberian Peninsula is drought, which occurs whenever precipitation ceases during various months.

Climate data for Getafe (1991-2020), extremes (1951-present) (altitude: 620 m, satellite view)
| Month | Jan | Feb | Mar | Apr | May | Jun | Jul | Aug | Sep | Oct | Nov | Dec | Year |
|---|---|---|---|---|---|---|---|---|---|---|---|---|---|
| Record high °C (°F) | 20.8 (69.4) | 23.0 (73.4) | 29.0 (84.2) | 32.6 (90.7) | 36.4 (97.5) | 41.0 (105.8) | 42.0 (107.6) | 42.6 (108.7) | 40.0 (104.0) | 32.6 (90.7) | 25.2 (77.4) | 21.8 (71.2) | 42.6 (108.7) |
| Mean daily maximum °C (°F) | 10.8 (51.4) | 12.9 (55.2) | 16.7 (62.1) | 19.2 (66.6) | 23.9 (75.0) | 29.8 (85.6) | 33.6 (92.5) | 32.9 (91.2) | 27.5 (81.5) | 21.0 (69.8) | 14.6 (58.3) | 11.1 (52.0) | 21.2 (70.1) |
| Daily mean °C (°F) | 6.3 (43.3) | 7.7 (45.9) | 11.0 (51.8) | 13.5 (56.3) | 17.7 (63.9) | 23.1 (73.6) | 26.5 (79.7) | 26.0 (78.8) | 21.3 (70.3) | 15.8 (60.4) | 10.0 (50.0) | 6.8 (44.2) | 15.5 (59.9) |
| Mean daily minimum °C (°F) | 1.7 (35.1) | 2.5 (36.5) | 5.3 (41.5) | 7.7 (45.9) | 11.5 (52.7) | 16.4 (61.5) | 19.4 (66.9) | 19.1 (66.4) | 15.1 (59.2) | 10.5 (50.9) | 5.4 (41.7) | 2.5 (36.5) | 9.8 (49.6) |
| Record low °C (°F) | −12.0 (10.4) | −12.0 (10.4) | −6.2 (20.8) | −2.6 (27.3) | −1.0 (30.2) | 4.2 (39.6) | 8.2 (46.8) | 7.2 (45.0) | 3.6 (38.5) | −2.0 (28.4) | −5.4 (22.3) | −10.0 (14.0) | −12.0 (10.4) |
| Average precipitation mm (inches) | 28 (1.1) | 31 (1.2) | 32 (1.3) | 38 (1.5) | 36 (1.4) | 16 (0.6) | 6 (0.2) | 8 (0.3) | 23 (0.9) | 54 (2.1) | 45 (1.8) | 37 (1.5) | 354 (13.9) |
| Average precipitation days (≥ 1 mm) | 5.4 | 5.0 | 5.4 | 6.1 | 5.6 | 2.6 | 1.1 | 1.4 | 2.9 | 6.9 | 6.1 | 5.6 | 54.1 |
| Average snowy days | 0.9 | 1.0 | 0.4 | 0 | 0 | 0 | 0 | 0 | 0 | 0 | 0.1 | 0.4 | 2.8 |
| Average relative humidity (%) | 75 | 66 | 58 | 55 | 50 | 40 | 34 | 37 | 47 | 63 | 73 | 78 | 56 |
| Mean monthly sunshine hours | 155 | 181 | 223 | 246 | 288 | 336 | 375 | 347 | 267 | 211 | 156 | 136 | 2,921 |
| Percentage possible sunshine | 51 | 60 | 60 | 62 | 65 | 75 | 82 | 82 | 71 | 61 | 53 | 47 | 64 |
Source: Agencia Estatal de Meteorología

=== Flora and Fauna ===
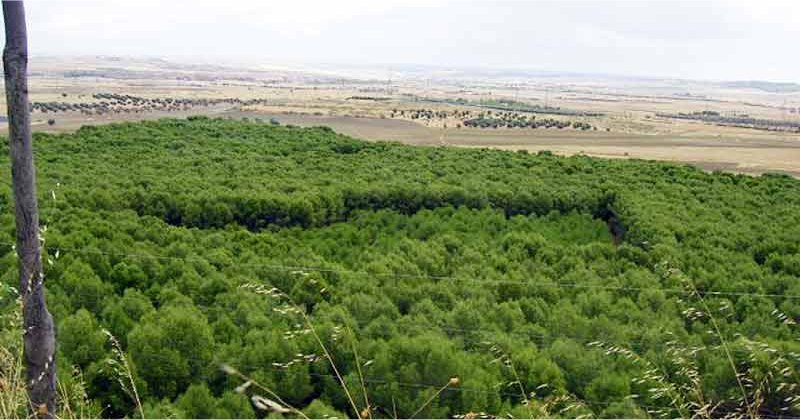
View from the Cerro de los Ángeles from the middle of the eastern municipal border. Visible are pine trees, olive trees, and extensive wheat fields.

The native vegetation of Getafe is characteristic of the mediterranean forest biome, consisting mostly of holm and cork oaks. Native flowering plants include those of the genus Cistus and the common broom (Cytisus scoparius), though these species are not abundant. This native forest and underbrush only occupies 16% of the surface of the municipal territory, mostly in the hills of the Marañosa and further east. The shores of the Manzanares River and Culebro Waterway contain deciduous trees and reeds.

Most undeveloped land is devoted to the cultivation of cereals (mostly wheat), and, to a lesser extent, to gardens in the fertile lowlands of the Manzanares river. Some areas have been reforested with stone pines (Pinus pinea) and Aleppo pines (Pinus halepensis). These areas include the Cerro de los Ángeles, the Prado Acedinos, part of the hills of the Marañosa, and part of the park in the Sector III neighborhood. Common trees in the parks and streets of the city are the horse chestnut (Aesculus hippocastanum), the acacia, the elm (Ulmus minor), and the stone pine. Other less common trees include cedars, cypress, Aleppo pines, plum trees, poplars, fir trees, and palm trees.

A significant population of small birds live within the city proper, including sparrows and pigeons. Larger birds, rabbits, foxes, wild boars, and weasels can be found in the more easterly parts of the municipality. The world's largest population of the common kestrel can be found in the Perales del Río neighborhood.

== Town Planning ==
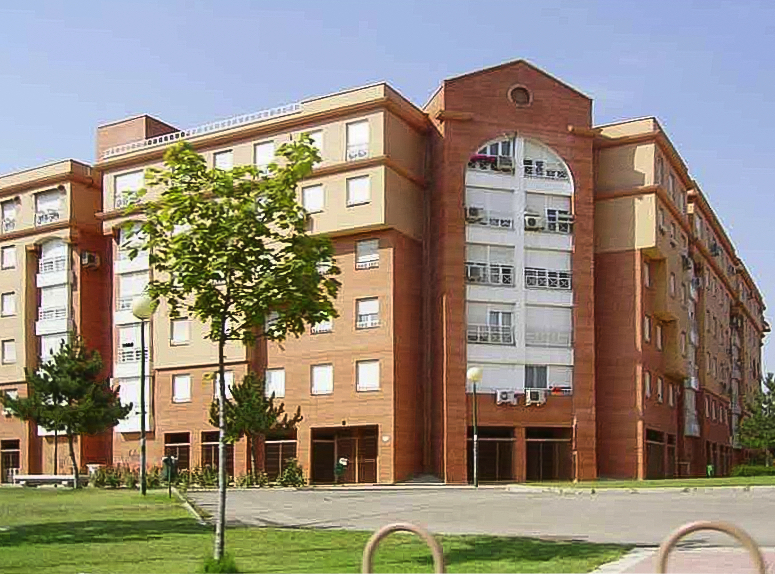
Modern building in the Getafe Norte neighborhood.

The urban portions of Getafe are organised in an almost longitudinal manner, from northeast to southwest. Thus, the elongated shape of Getafe today is due primarily to the close proximity of the Getafe Air Force Base, which impedes city growth to the southeast. The most important streets of the city are Calle Madrid and Calle Toledo. These two roads are pedestrian through the center of Getafe, and are part of what was a royal road connecting Madrid and Toledo during the Middle Ages. Getafe has other important streets and avenues organizing its neighborhoods, such as the Avenida de España, Avenida de Los Ángeles, Avenida de las Ciudades, Avenida Juan Carlos I, and Calle Ferrocarril.

The popular architectural style in Getafe is generally characterised by two-story buildings with tile roofs, various small balconies on the second floor, and a bare brick façade. These types of houses can be found in the Getafe Centro neighbourhood, though their numbers are decreasing as existing houses are vacated and demolished to make room for new townhouse developments. The average height of buildings in Getafe is five floors, approximately 60 feet (17 metres). This peculiarity is due to the proximity of the Getafe Air Force Base, which places limits on the height of buildings. Few buildings in Getafe surpass eight stories in height.

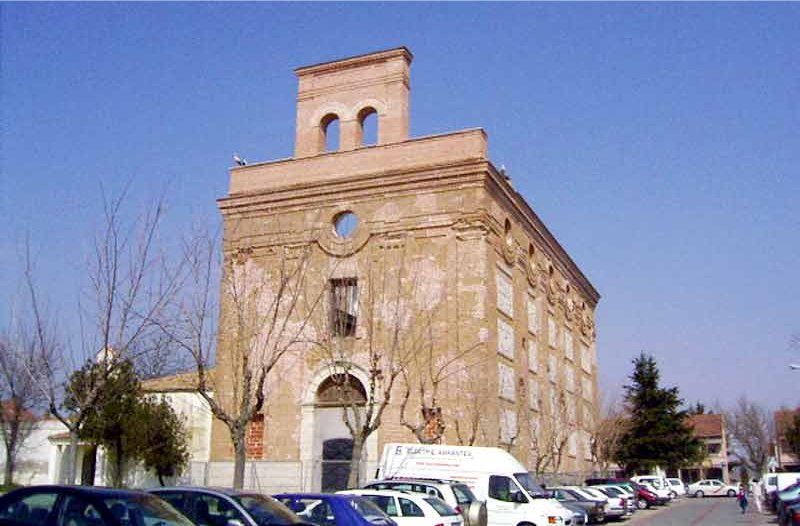
Iglesia de Perales del Río; one of the oldest buildings in the city.

Due to the developmental limitations imposed by the Air Force Base and the municipality borders, the city's parks and green spaces are important conservation areas. Two of the largest parks are located within the Sector III and La Alhóndiga neighbourhoods. These green zones include an artificial lake and river, two pine forests, and a number of hiking trails. The parks cover an area approximately the size of Getafe Centro, and make up the western part of the urban centre, separated from the east by the A-42. A series of parks of various sizes are located within the city proper. Outside of the city are two pine forests with picnic areas, fountains, and kiosks.

Getafe's urban centre is undergoing various expansions of its urban centre. One of these is the construction and establishment of the El Bercial neighbourhood. This expansion of El Bercial will quadruple the size of the neighbourhood and will allow the city to expand to the northeast, linking El Bercial to the urban centre. The Los Olivos industrial park is expanding eastward, while at the same time, the Perales del Río neighbourhood grows westward, bringing these two neighbourhoods closer together. The Área Tecnológica del Sur is being constructed in the southern parts of the municipal district, along the M-50. The Área will be an area dedicated to a number of exposition halls and areas for new industrial development.

Getafe township has a number of projects underway to expand urban areas. One of these projects is expanding the Sector III neighborhood by constructing housing at the feel of Buenavista hill. Another project involves creating a residential neighborhood called Los Molinos, located east of Getafe Norte and north of the Los Ángeles industrial park. A third project calls for the construction of a university, the Universidad Politécnica de Getafe, which will include three departments and a central building.

=== Administrative division ===
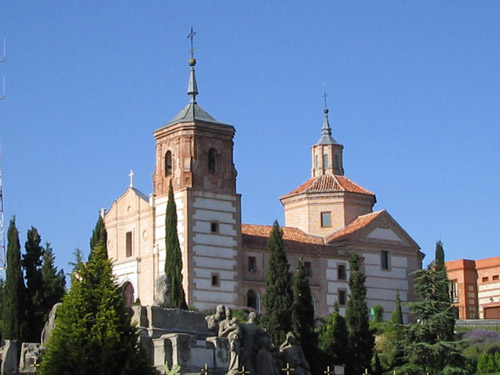
Hermitage del Cerro de los Ángeles.

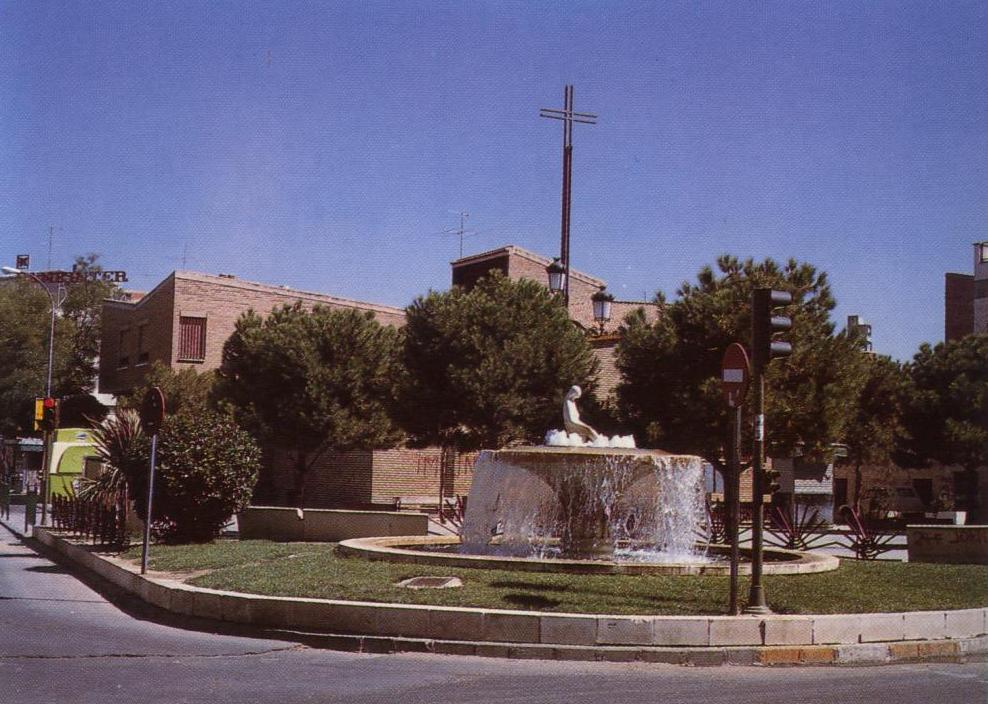
Central plaza in the Getafe Centro neighbourhood.

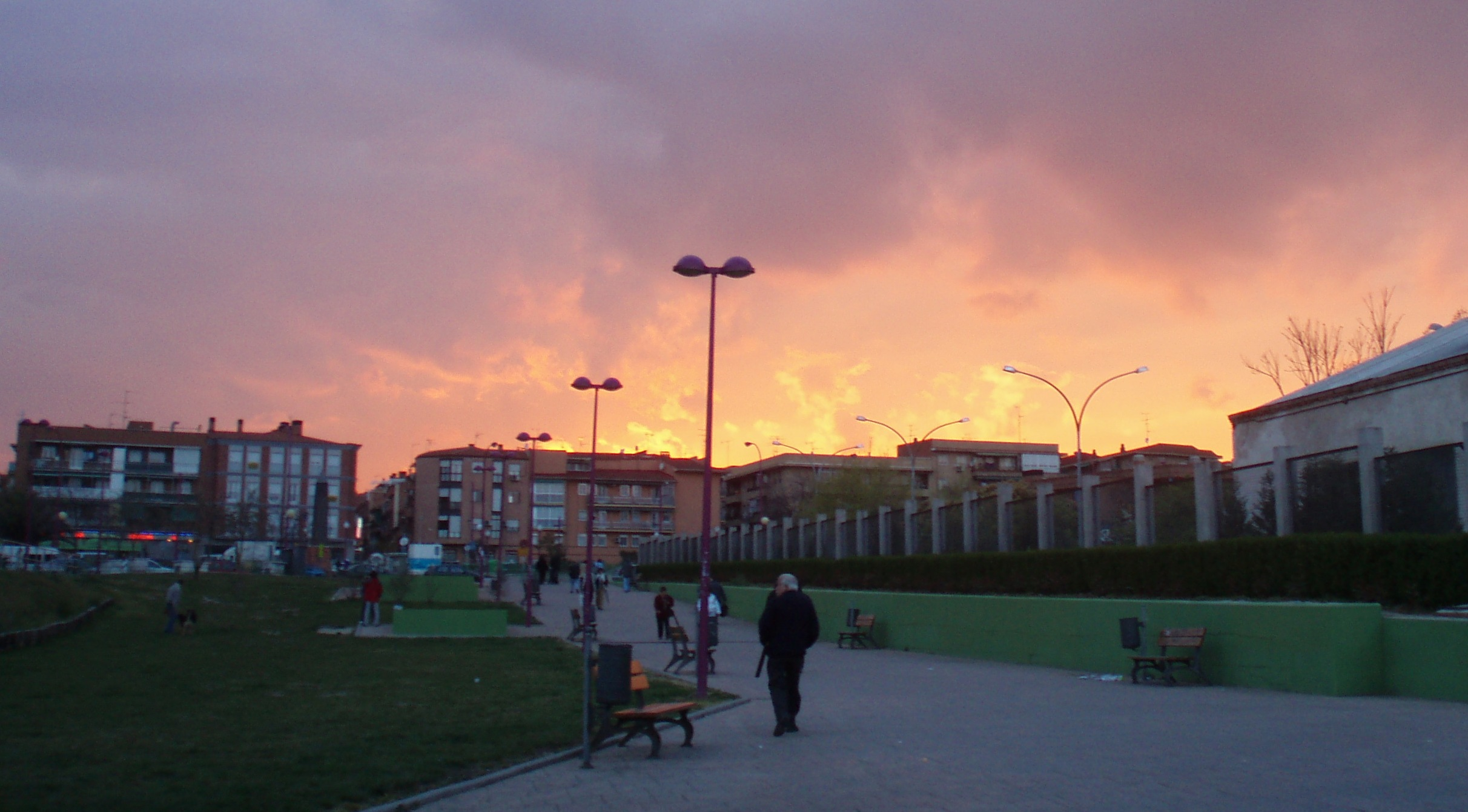
Evening in the La Alhóndiga neighbourhood.

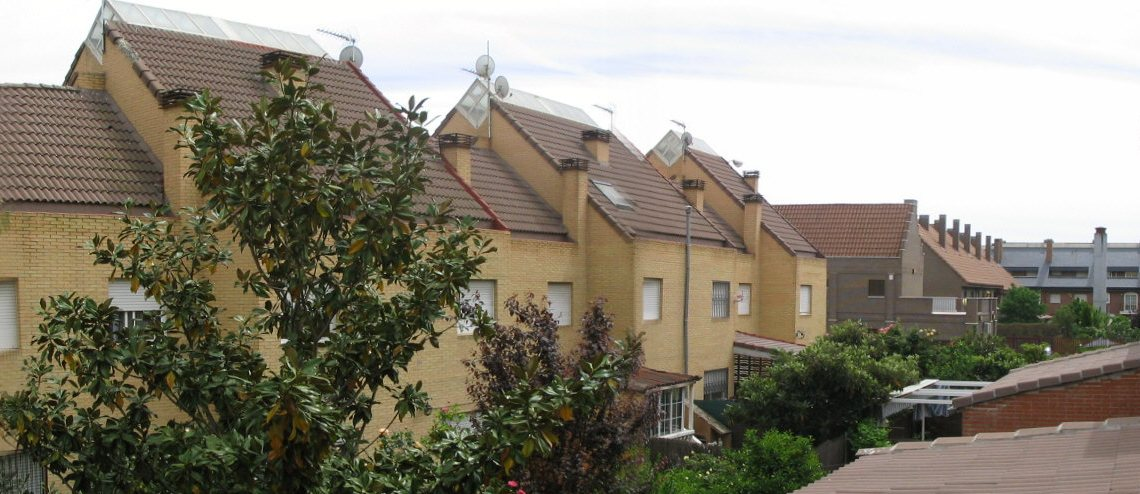
Houses in Sector III neighbourhood.

Prior to the 20th century, Getafe had only one neighbourhood, which encompassed the modern Getafe Centro and La Alhóndiga neighborhoods. The Perales del Río neighborhood is also one of the oldest neighbourhoods in the municipality, dating from approximately the 17th century. Since the 1960s, a population boom prompted the creation of new neighbourhoods, such as those of San Isidro, Juan de la Cierva, Las Margaritas, and El Bercial. In the 1980s, the Sector III neighbourhood was built and the Perales del Río was significantly expanded. During the following decade, the Getafe Norte neighbourhood was built. Today, Getafe is divided into nine neighbourhoods and five industrial parks.

Getafe Centro
The oldest neighbourhood in the Getafe municipality, Getafe Centro includes the city centre. It maintains an authentic, traditional, and commercial ambience. The most populous neighbourhood in Getafe, it includes a large number of pedestrian streets. Town hall, the cathedral, the Colegio de Escuelas Pías, and the Hospitalillo de San José are all located within this neighbourhood.
El Bercial
El Bercial is a small neighbourhood isolated from the city centre and merged with the industrial park Leganés. Dating from the 1970s, the neighbourhood is currently experiencing significant growth.
Getafe Norte
Constructed in the 1990s, Getafe Norte is the northernmost neighbourhood in the city and contains the football stadium Coliseum Alfonso Pérez.
Juan de la Cierva
Juan de la Cierva is a centrally located commercial neighbourhood named after the famous engineer Juan de la Cierva. Dating back to the 1970s, the neighbourhood is the second-most populous of Getafe.
La Alhóndiga
One of the oldest and most authentic neighbourhoods of Getafe, La Alhóndiga is located west of Getafe Centro, alongside the autovía A-42 and the University Hospital of Getafe.
Las Margaritas
Las Margaritas is a small neighbourhood located next to the Universidad Carlos III and its residence halls. It dates back to the 1970s, and is home to an important sports centre.
Perales del Río
Perales del Río is the neighborhood located furthest from the city centre. It is located alongside the Manzanares River in the extreme east of the Getafe municipality. One of the oldest neighbourhoods, it is experiencing continuous growth.
San Isidro
San Isidro is located south of the city centre, and includes an importance sports centre and large parks. It dates back to the 1970s.
Sector III
The Sector III neighbourhood consists primarily of single family homes and living areas. It is the largest neighbourhood in the municipality, and the third most populous. Built in the 1980s, it was expanded in 1997 to include a new development called Arroyo Culebro. The Conservatorio Profesional de Música de Getafe is here.
Five industrial parks
The five industrial parks are spread out across the peripherals of the city. The eastern areas include Los Ángeles, San Marcos, and Los Olivos parks. Parks south of the city limits include El Culebro and El Rosón.

== Infrastructure ==
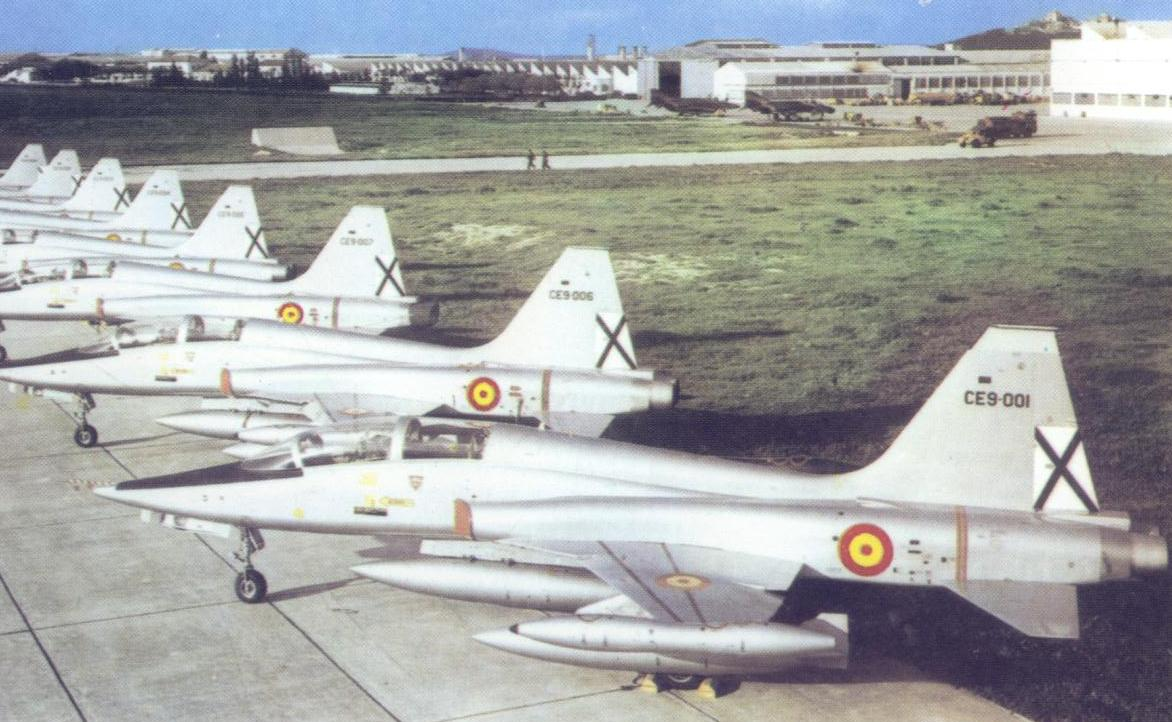
Planes at the Getafe Air Force Base.

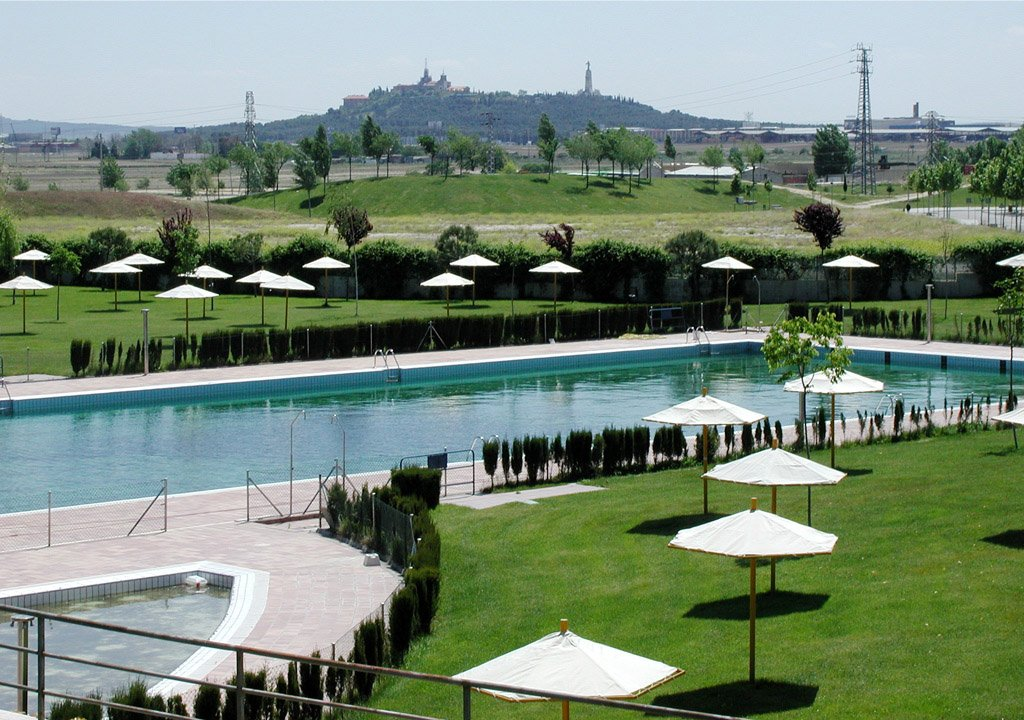
Public pool of Getafe Norte. The Cerro de los Ángeles in the background.

This city has grown substantially in the past decades, which has caused similar growth in the number of infrastructures. Some of the more notable of these are:

- The Humanities and Judicial Sciences faculties and the academic rector of the Universidad Carlos III de Madrid. These installations are in the central neighborhood of Las Margaritas.
- The student residence halls "Fernando de los Ríos," situated 500 meters from the university in the same neighborhood.
- The University Hospital of Getafe, famous for its burn unit. It is adjacent to the A-42, and is one of the largest hospitals in the Southern region of the autonomous community of Madrid.
- The Getafe Air Force Base, one of the first in Spain. It's located Southeast of the urban center, and it is almost exclusively for military use. The runway of the Getafe Air Force Base is shared with engineering and manufacturing facilities of Airbus (formerly Construcciones Aeronáuiticas) and its three divisions: Commercial Aircraft, Defence and Space, and Helicopters.
- The Teatro Federico García Lorca, a large cultural center located in the Getafe Centro neighborhood. It was constructed during the 1990s and produces a large number of cultural performances.
- The Coliseum Alfonso Pérez, the soccer stadium for Getafe CF, is located in the Getafe Norte neighborhood. Inaugurated in 1998, the stadium has a seating capacity of 14,400.
- The Conservatorio Profesional de Música de Getafe, located in the Sector III neighborhood. It is the only public musical conservatory in the Southern region of the autonomous community of Madrid.
- The Cercanías Madrid C-4 train line has passed underground through Getafe since 2001 to minimize noise and divisions. The old train route has been converted into a park.
- The Cementerio de Nuestra Señora de la Soledad (Cemetery of Our Lady of Peace), located South of the Air Force base, which is no longer accepting new clients due to the construction of a new cemetery.
- A water purification plant, which purifies the waters of the Manzanares River is located alongside Perales del Río on the outskirts of Getafe. Another purification plant in Southern Getafe cleans the waters of the Culebro waterway.
- The bullring, constructed in 2004, is located within the fairgrounds. Bullfights are common here during holidays and festivals.
- Seven sports centers and three public pools are located within various neighborhoods.
- Fifteen Catholic churches, eleven civic centers, and five public libraries.

== Media ==
The municipality has a number of local newspapers. These include El Buzón and El Iceberg, which can both be found online and in print, El Buzón de Getafe, Observador, Acción Getafense, Vivir en Getafe, Getafe Ahora, the sports weekly digest Zona Sur, Boletín del Ayuntamiento, Getafe al día, Getafe Capital and Mercado, among others. The local radio broadcast, Radio Getafe, was absorbed by Cadena COPE (101.8 FM). During the 1990s, the city had its own local television station called Tele Getafe. In addition, there exists even more digital-only media.

== Transportation ==
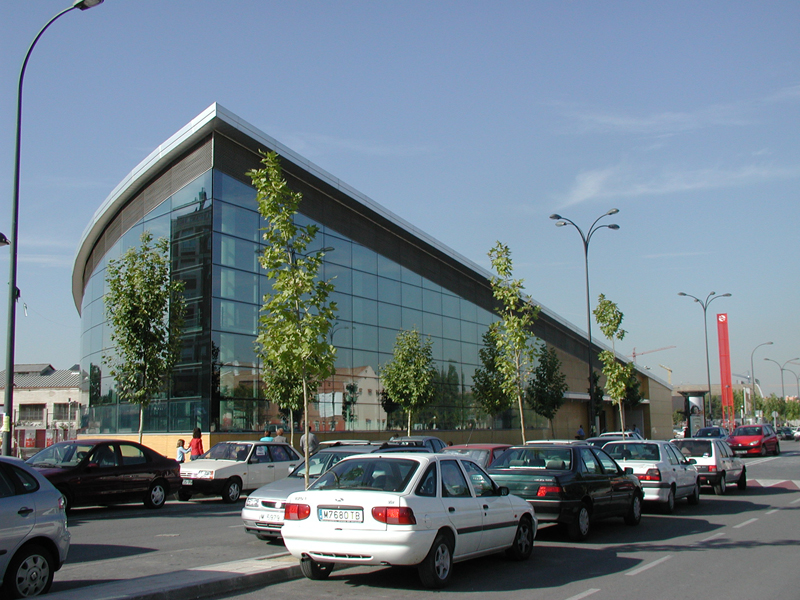
Train and metro station Getafe Central.

=== Roads ===
Four highways and divided highways pass through Getafe: two beltways (A-42 and A-4) and two highways leading through Madrid (M-45 and M-50). Another two-lane road connects Getafe with Leganés, and two provincial roads lead to Perales del Río. The following is a list of major arteries:

Highways

- M-45, highway to Madrid. 4 km of this highway is inside Getafe, crossing it from West to East. The road marks the Northern limits of the Getafe Norte and El Bercial neighborhoods.
- M-50, highway to Madrid. 13.6 km of this highway run through Getafe, and it crosses the city center West to East. The road marks the Southern limits of the Sector III neighborhood and the Northern limit of the El Culebro industrial park.

Motorways (Autovías)

- A-4, the Highway of the South, previously called the N-IV. 7.25 km of this highway run through Getafe, and it crosses the center north–south. The road separates the Los Ángeles and San Marcos industrial parks from the Los Olivos industrial park and the Cerro de los Ángeles.
- A-42, the Toledo Highway, previously called the N-401. 6.13 km of this highway run through Getafe, and it cuts across the center in a north–south orientation. The road separates the Section III and El Bercial neighborhoods from the city center. To lessen the isolation of these neighborhoods, the local government has begun a project to create an underground passage for the A-42 as it crosses through Getafe.

Other roads

- M-406, two-lane road. Passes through Alcorcón, Leganés and Getafe. Once the M-406 enters Getafe it becomes the Calle Leganés.
- M-301, road which exits Villaverde, passes through Perales del Río, and terminates in San Martín de la Vega.
- Road from Cerro de los Ángeles to Perales del Río. This road is a continuation of the M-406, and connects central Getafe with Perales del Río.

=== Public transportation ===
The Air Force Base is for military use only. As it is, the city center of Getafe is 26 km from Madrid Barajas International Airport, which can be accessed via the M-40.

The city has eight urban bus lines; eight lines connecting Getafe to Madrid; five lines to the municipalities of Valdemoro, Leganés, Alcorcón, Parla, Serranillos, Casarrubuelos and Griñón; and two night lines to Madrid. These lines are as follows:

- L-1: Sector III - Ambulatorio
- L-2: Ambulatorio - Sector III
- L-3: El Bercial - Avenida Juan de Borbón
- L-4: Hospital - Perales del Río
- L-5: Avenida España - Cementerio
- 428A: Getafe - Área Empresarial Andalucía
- Pi-1: Getafe Central - Los Ángeles industrial park - Los Olivos industrial park
- Pi-2: Getafe Central - San Marcos industrial park- El Lomo industrial park
- 411: Madrid (Legazpi station) - Perales del Río
- 441: Madrid (Plaza Elíptica) - Getafe (Sector III)
- 442: Madrid (Plaza Elíptica) - Getafe (Juan de la Cierva)
- 443: Madrid (Plaza Elíptica) - Getafe (las Margaritas)

- 444: Madrid (Plaza Elíptica) - Getafe (Sector III)
- 446: Madrid (Palos de la Frontera) - Getafe (El Bercial)
- 447: Madrid (Legazpi) - Getafe (Hospital)
- 448: Madrid (Legazpi) - Getafe (via Villaverde)
- 428: Getafe - Valdemoro
- 450: Getafe - Leganés - Alcorcón
- 455: Getafe - Pinto, 462: Getafe - Parla
- 468: Getafe - Griñón - Casarrubuelos - Serranillos
- 488: Leganés (San Nicasio) - Getafe (Los Espartales)
- N801: Madrid (Atocha) - Getafe (Sector III - Pórtico de Andalucía)
- N805: Madrid (Atocha)- Getafe (Centro / Sector III)

Two Cercanías Madrid train lines pass through Getafe along a north–south route. These lines are: C-3 (stations: El Casar and Getafe Industrial) and C-4 (stations: Las Margaritas-Universidad, Getafe Centro, and Getafe Sector III). There are a total of five stations, two of which connect to the Madrid Metro system.

Since April 2003, Getafe contains eight stations along the Madrid Metro Line 12. These stations are: El Bercial, Los Espartales, El Casar, Juan de la Cierva, Getafe Central, Alonso de Mendoza, Conservatorio y Arroyo Culebro. The government of the Community of Madrid is currently planning on expanding Line 3 through the El Casar station.

== Demographics ==
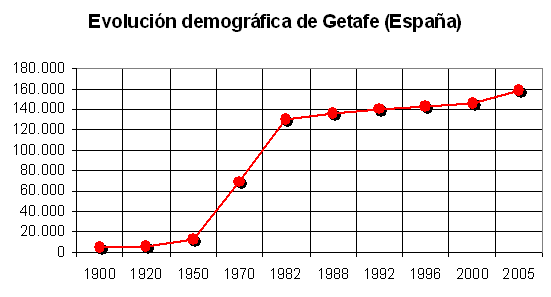
Graph showing the population of Getafe during the 20th and 21st centuries.

Historical population
| Year | Pop. | ±% |
|---|---|---|
| 1842 | 3,494 | — |
| 1857 | 3,691 | +5.6% |
| 1877 | 3,498 | −5.2% |
| 1887 | 3,603 | +3.0% |
| 1900 | 4,337 | +20.4% |
| 1910 | 4,667 | +7.6% |
| 1920 | 5,255 | +12.6% |
| 1930 | 8,154 | +55.2% |
| 1940 | 7,373 | −9.6% |
| 1950 | 10,670 | +44.7% |
| 1960 | 19,224 | +80.2% |
| 1970 | 69,396 | +261.0% |
| 1981 | 126,558 | +82.4% |
| 1991 | 138,704 | +9.6% |
| 2001 | 151,479 | +9.2% |
| 2011 | 168,642 | +11.3% |
| 2021 | 183,872 | +9.0% |
Source: INE

The population of Getafe, estimated at 159,300 in 2007 by the Instituto Nacional de Estadística, is unevenly distributed across a number of neighborhoods: Sector III, San Isidro, Perales del Río, Las Margaritas, La Alhóndiga, Juan de la Cierva, Getafe Norte, El Bercial, and Getafe Central.

The Getafe Centro neighborhood has the most housing, with 12,574 units; the Juan de la Cierva neighborhood is a close second with 12,072 housing units. The least developed in terms of housing are the neighborhoods of Perales del Río and El Bercial, with 1815 and 1820 units respectively, though these numbers are expected to increase shortly due to a number of recently implemented urban initiatives. The most populous neighborhoods are those of Juan de la Cierva (32,925 inhabitants), Getafe Centro (32,160 inhabitants), and Sector III (24,217 inhabitants). 30,000 inhabitants of Getafe are between the ages of 20 and 40, and 24 inhabitants are 100 years old or more (21 women, 3 men). Women out-number men in Getafe, numbering 79,514 women to 78,849 men.

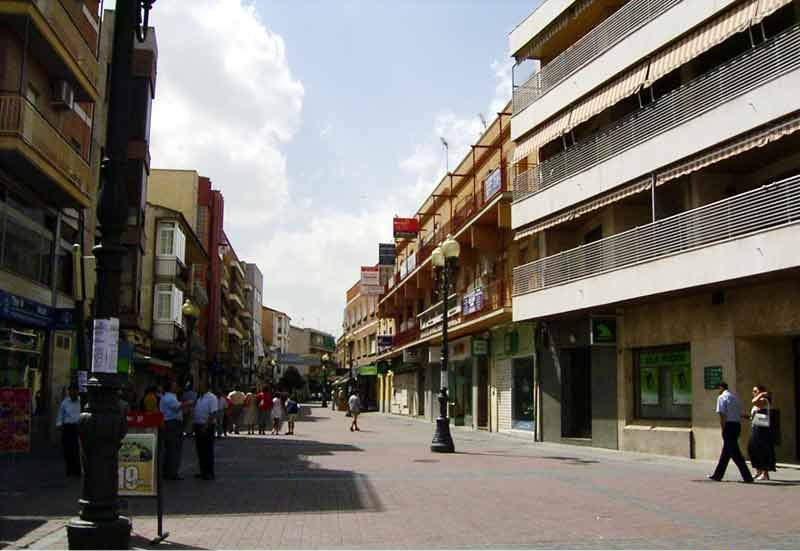
Pedestrian portion of the Calle Madrid, one of the most commercial and central streets in the city.

The foreign population of Getafe increases every year, and makes up about 9% of the total population. Immigrants generally come from Latin America, eastern Europe, and western Europe. The constant annual growth rate falls between 0.01% and 3.00%, birth rate falls between 0.01% and 8%, and the death rate falls between 4% and 8%. From 1996 to 2002, the growth rate of Getafe fell between 5 and 10%. The median age of inhabitants is less than 22 years. More than 85% of the population consider themselves Catholic, but only 20% of these people are actual active members of Catholic congregations.

The population of Getafe experienced strong growth during the second half of the 20th century. From the Middle Ages to 1900, the population varied between 2,500 and 6,000 inhabitants. In 1950, the population was 12,254; in 1970, the population was 69,424; in 1977, 124,601. These figures demonstrate the population growth spurt that began in 1960 and continues to the present day. At present, the city's population is generally growing at a continual, moderate rate, at approximately 1,700 people per year. The year 2006 was the first year since the 17th century that the population actually decreased, falling by 2,043 people.

Getafe is listed as the 41st most populous city in Spain, after Salamanca and before Logroño. Within the community of Madrid, Getafe is the 7th most populous city, after Alcorcón and before Torrejón de Ardoz. An inhabitant of Getafe is called getafeño or getafense, though the latter is more common. The postal codes of the city are: 28901, 28902, 28903, 28904, 28905, 28907, 28909.

== Economy ==
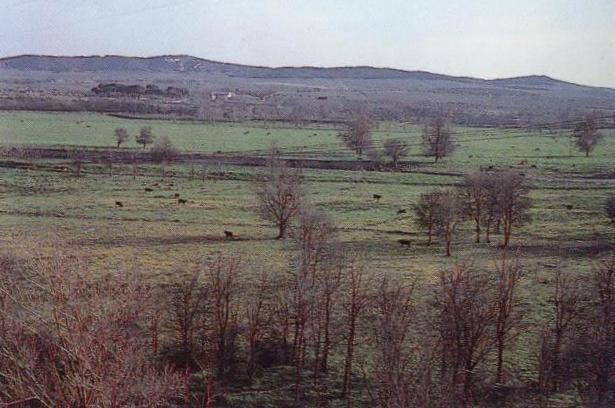
Natural surroundings of the Getafe municipal district. The hills of the Marañosa can be seen in the distance.

Getafe's economy was historically agricultural. The first factories were built in the area at the beginning of the 20th century, but it wasn't until the second half of the century that industry gained prominence. By the 1960s, industry had become the primary economic focus.

Today, the economy is mostly industrial, with a large focus on Getafe's five industrial parks. After Madrid, Getafe is the most industrialized city in the community of Madrid, with numerous industries such as John Deere, Siemens, and Construcciones Aeronáuticas SA. The city boasts five industrial parks spread across the peripheries of the city. The city's industrial activities are divided across several industries: 34% metallurgy, 20% food processing, 14% wood and furniture production, 6% textile, furs, and skins. The remaining 26% includes various other industries, such as paper production, graphic arts, and construction, among others. A number of quarries are located in the easterly areas of the municipality which are being mined extensively.

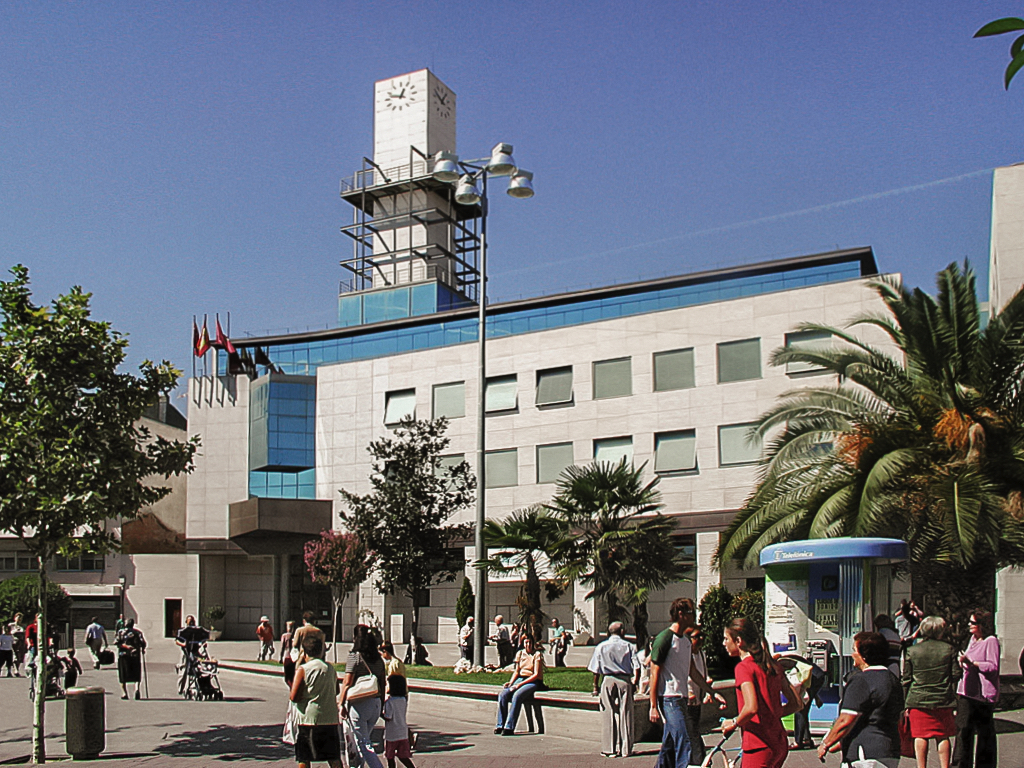
Getafe's City hall.

The service industry began to emerge at the end of the 1990s with the construction of several new malls and entertainment areas. The importance of agriculture on the local economy has decreased significantly in the past century, though eastern parts of the municipality still include good plots of irrigated and nonirrigated land. The major crop is wheat, with smaller cultivations of olive trees, grape vines, and vegetables. Herding and livestock are slowly diminishing, though they can still be found in the vicinity of Buenavista hill and the fields along the Manzanares river.

The median per capita income of the inhabitants of Getafe is €10,000, which is lower than the €12,500 median income of the community of Madrid. The most wealthy neighborhoods are Sector III and Getafe Norte, with a median income of €13,000 . The poorest neighborhoods are La Alhóndiga, Getafe Centro, and San Isidro, whose median incomes average €9,000 . In January 2006, the unemployment rate was 8.4%

== Main sights ==
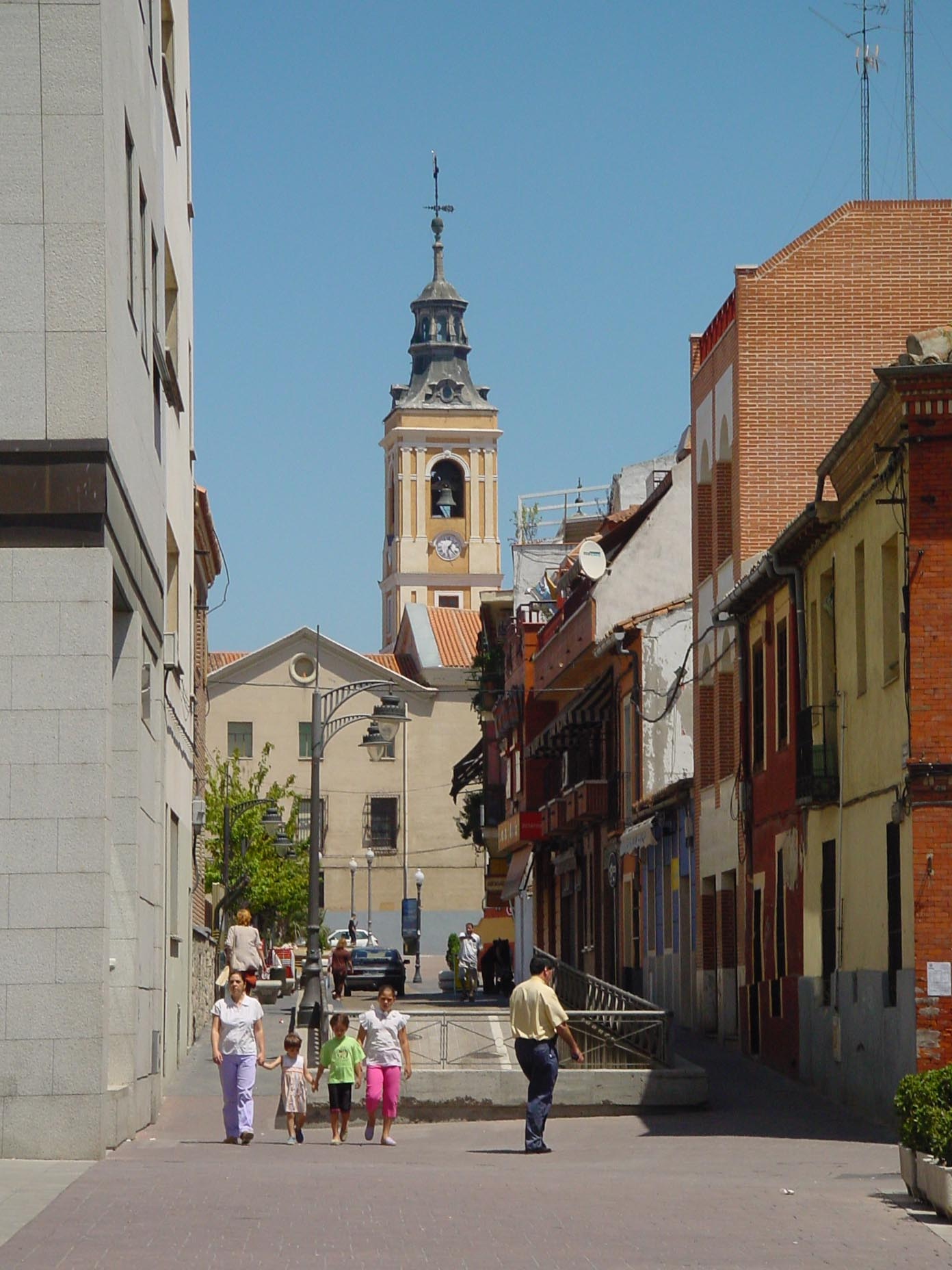
Escuelas Pías, a center of religious education founded in 1609

Getafe has a number of monuments and areas of interest pertaining to its history. The most famous and most visited part of Getafe is the Cerro de los Ángeles, but there are other important places, such as the Catedral de Nuestra Señora de La Magdalena and the Hospitalillo de San José.

- Cerro de los Ángeles (Hill of the Angels) is a famous hill located near the industrial parks of Getafe. The hills are considered the geographic center of the Iberian Peninsula. The hermitage of Nuestra Señora de los Ángeles (Our Lady of the Angels) and the monument to the Sagrado Corazón (sacred heart) are located at the summit. The hill is visible from almost all parts of Getafe.
- Catedral de Nuestra Señora de La Magdalena, the diocesan seat of the southern zone of the community of Madrid. This Renaissance church dating from the 18th century boasts a tower in the mudéjar style and a Baroque altarpiece. Declared an artistic historical monument in 1958, the cathedral is the seat of the Diocese of Getafe.

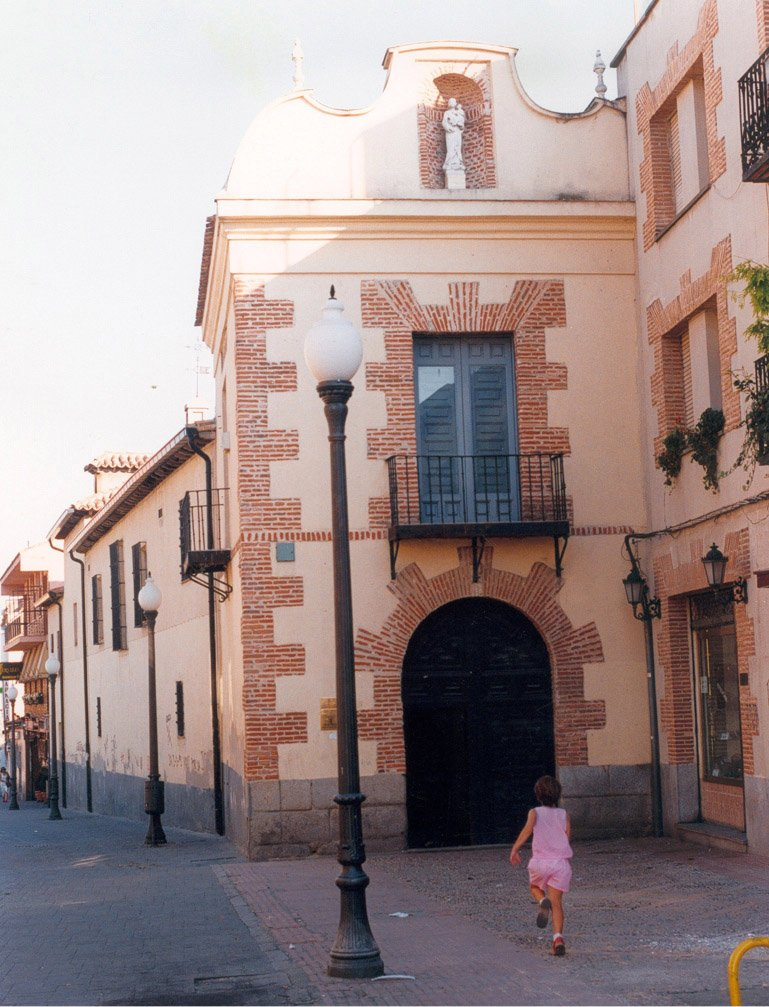
Façade of the Hospitalillo de San José.

- Hospitalillo de San José. It is an ancient hospital constructed in 1529 to improve the health of local inhabitants, the Hospitalillo showcases a very Castilian style of architecture with a central patio and chapel.
- Colegio de Escuelas Pías. Constructed in 1609, the Colegio is the most important religious school in the southern zone of the community of Madrid. This much-visited location can be found in the center of the city. The grounds include a small sports center and a lush park.
- Biblioteca Ricardo de la Vega. Built as a prison in 1617, the building was converted to a library in the middle of the 20th century. The building was constructed in a simple style with rectangular floors.
- Iglesia de los Santos Justo y Pastor, Dating from the 16th century, the church is located in the Perales del Río neighborhood. The church was reconstructed and restored in 2004.
- Universidad Carlos III de Madrid. The dean's office and three faculties of the university are located in Getafe. Some of these faculties are currently located in buildings with served as military barracks in the beginning of the 20th century.

== Culture ==
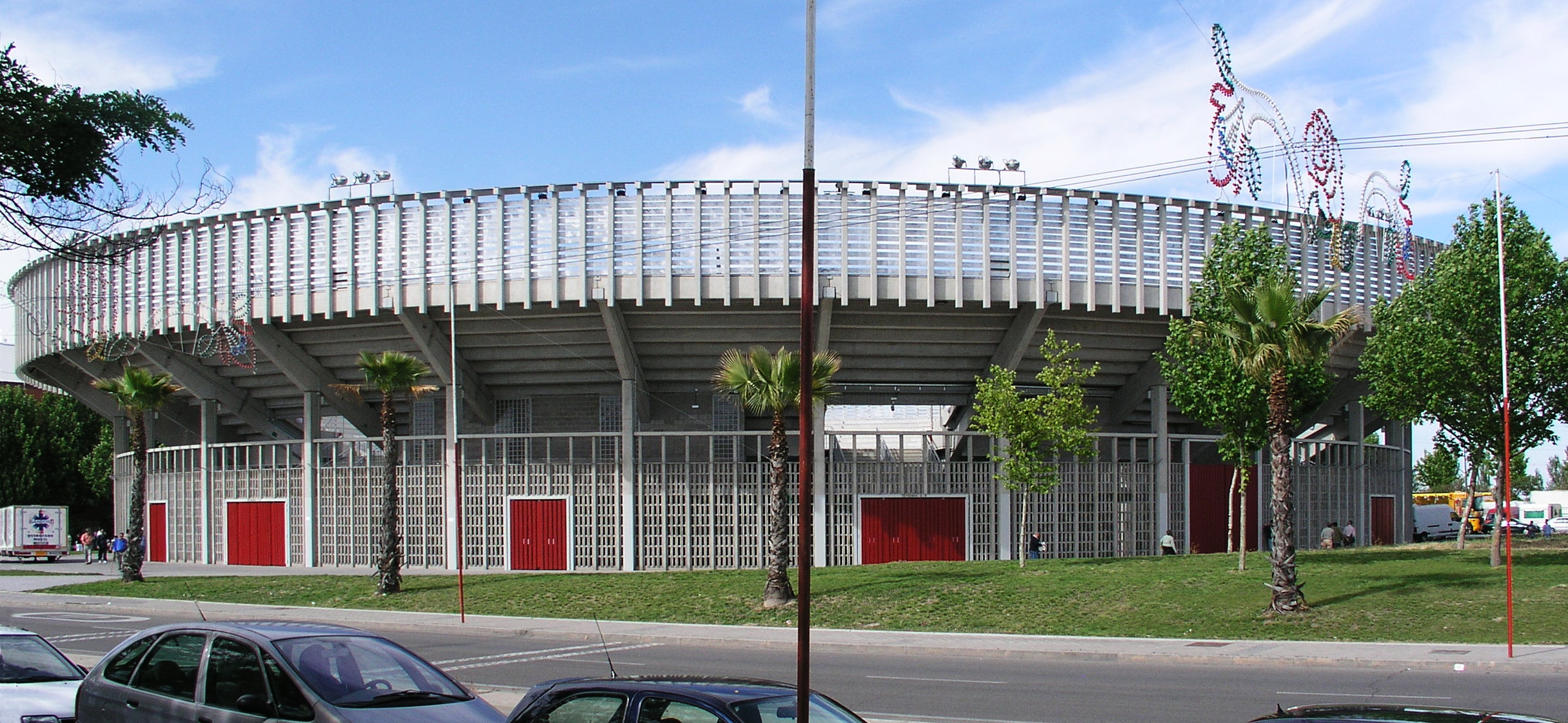
Getafe bullring.

Culture in Getafe is represented by various institutions, such as the Universidad Carlos III de Madrid, whose academic rector and three faculties of the humanities and legal sciences are located in Getafe. This university has an award-winning chorus and orchestras which is renowned throughout all of Spain. The Conservatorio Profesional de Música de Getafe (Professional Conservatory of Music of Getafe), which was established in 2000, has become the public conservatory for the entire Southern region of the autonomous community of Madrid. The Teatro Auditorio Federico García Lorca (Theater Auditorium Federico García Lorca), one of the largest and most important in Southern Madrid, is the setting for a multitude of plays and concerts. In addition to these establishments, Getafe boasts eight civic centers and a chain of public libraries spread across the different neighborhoods of Getafe. The Centro de Poesía José Hierro (José Hierro Center of Poetry), a place for the creation and study, is located alongside the library of Sector III. The legacy of the poet José Hierro can be found within this center, along with historical magazines, a photo library, and a video library. In 2005, began a project to construct the Museo de la Aviación de Getafe (Getafe Aviation Museum), which will be designed by the prestigious architect Norman Foster.

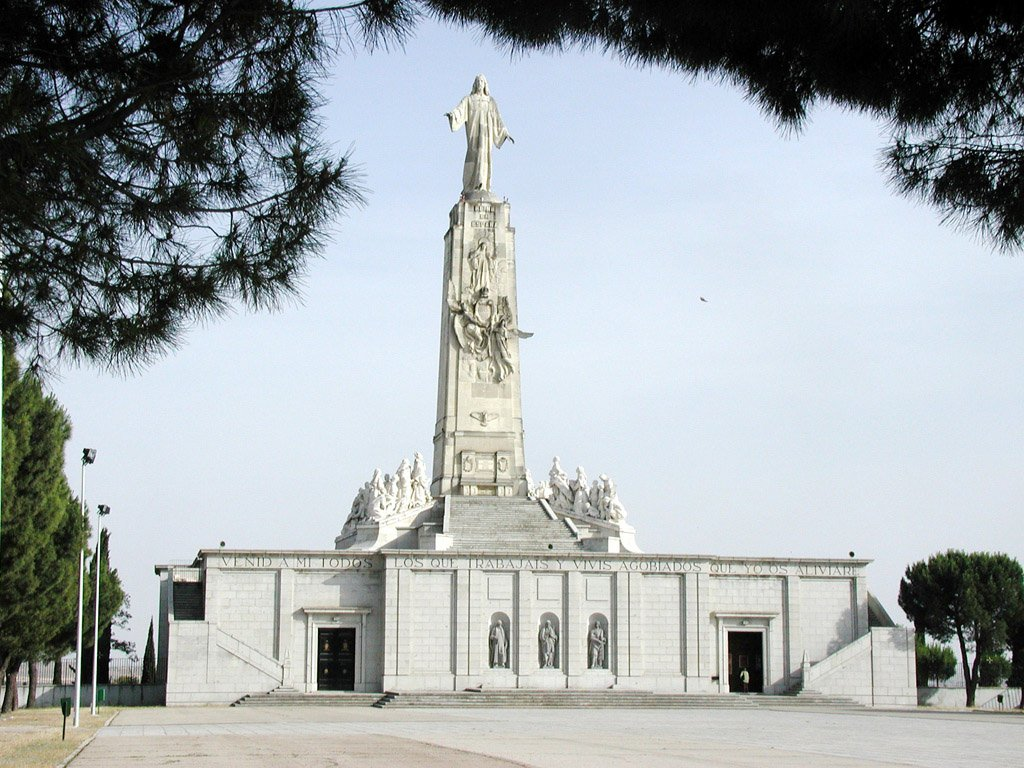
Monument of The Angels.

Close to 40% of the inhabitants of Getafe come from distinct autonomous communities within Madrid. Many of these groups have created Casas Regionales (Regional Houses), places were people from similar regional backgrounds can meet for cultural activities. Some of the more prominent Casas Regionales are those of Extremadura, Castile-La Mancha, Murcia, Andalusia, and Castile and León. The Conservatorio Profesional de Música de Getafe offers concerts of classical music in its 400-seats concert hall.

=== Celebrations and holidays ===
The patron saint's day in Getafe is celebrated 40 days after Easter Sunday, which means that the feast day occurs on a different day each year. The feast day generally falls between mid-May and early June. The feast officially begin on that Saturday, but celebrations generally begin nine days prior, on the day of the Ascension—the day that the Virgin of the Angels descended from the Cerro de los Ángeles.

Nine days after the ascension, the celebrations begin officially. The "sábado de las fiestas" (Saturday of the festivities), as it is popularly known, begins with an address in the Plaza de la Constitución, following an explosive display of the concussive effects of co-ordinated firecracker and fireworks barrages in the Calle Jardines. A fair is held during these days on the fairgrounds, political parties set up stalls on the Calle Ferrocarril, and there are a number of cultural activities, including concerts and bull fights. A week after the beginning of festivities, a procession passes through the center of town, during which caramels and trinkets are thrown into the crowds. The festivities end eight days after the opening address.

A number of cultural activities occur during the days of Christmas, such as special Christmas concerts, a large Christmas pageant in the interior patio of the Hospitalillo de San José, and the processions of the Three Wise Men on 5 January. Traditionally Carnivals include cavalcades of disguises and cultural activities. Two to four religious processions occur during Holy Week, originating from various churches and moving through the streets of the city.

=== Education ===
Public education in Getafe includes six pre-schools (up to 5 years), 23 elementary schools (until 12 years), and 14 secondary schools. There are few private schools, the most important being: the Piarist schools of religious education; the Colegio Los Ángeles, which educated children from age 1 through their second year of Bachillerato (a specialized educational program of 2 to 4 years after secondary school but before university); Los Aristos, a school with a sports club and covered pool. There are a number of professional development centers located throughout Getafe. Finally, the academic rector of the Universidad Carlos III is located in Getafe, along with three of its humanities and judicial science faculties. Alongside the university is the student housing complex "Fernando de los Ríos."

=== Gastronomy ===
The typical gastronomy of Getafe is very similar, if not identical, to that of Madrid. The climate, the local produce, and history have contributed to the development of this varied gastronomy. The dishes most representative of Getafe are the cocido madrileño, tripe a la madrileña, chickpea stew, Spanish omelette, sea bream a la madrileña, red cabbage, and others. In terms of wine, the most prominent are the wines of Madrid. Of these, the most famous are those of San Martín de Valdeiglesias, Arganda del Rey, and Navalcarnero.

In the large malls and on the central streets of Getafe, it is possible to find a variety of restaurants.

== Shopping and entertainment ==
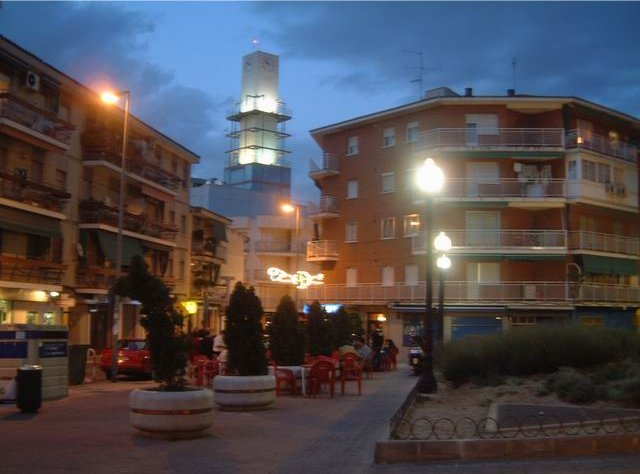
Tables in a restaurant in central Getafe on a summer night.

Getafe is a city for shopping and entertainment; many stores are conveniently situated in the urban center and within various large shopping malls. In Centro, the oldest and most populous neighborhood in Getafe, the area with the most stores and businesses is the intersection between Toledo Street and Madrid Street. These boulevards are mostly pedestrian. Another commercialized central area is the Avenue of Juan de la Cierva.

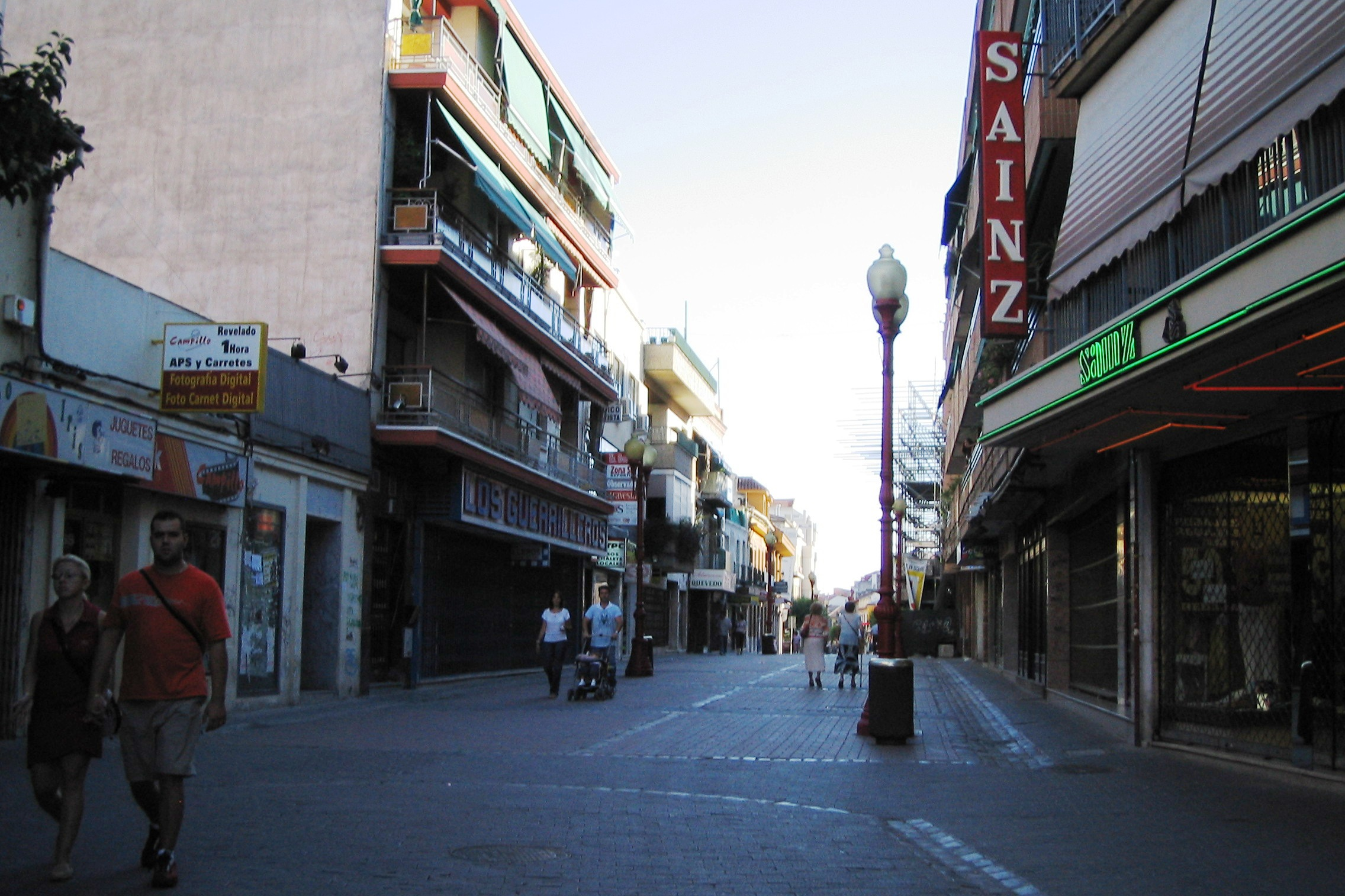
Madrid Street, commercial area.

Further away from the center, is another mall called Getafe 3, which is located within the neighborhood Sector III. This complex contains an Auchan (international retail chain), various restaurants, and many clothing and shoe stores. In the neighborhood Getafe Norte is the Bulevar, where there is a Carrefour, many restaurants, seven movie theaters, and numerous clothing stores. The major shopping mall called Nassica is situated in the Área Tecnológica del Sur, accessible via the M-50. Nassica has electronics and hardware stores, furniture stores, 25 restaurants, a bowling alley, recreational areas, a permanent street market, and 20 cinemas. The newest mall, called El Bercial, can be found in the neighborhood El Bercial. It contains an El Corte Inglés, a Hipercor, and two cafeteria-restaurants. The area known for its nightlife is found in Centro, which contains the most tapas bars and discos in the city.

Despite Getafe's proximity to the highly developed city of Madrid, the Getafe includes two pine forests, which have tables, picnic areas, barbecues, soccer fields, and children's parks. One of these forests is the Prado Acedinos, located the South of the urban center, accessible via exit 16 on the A-42. The other is the Cerro de los Ángeles, accessible via the A-4.

== Sports ==
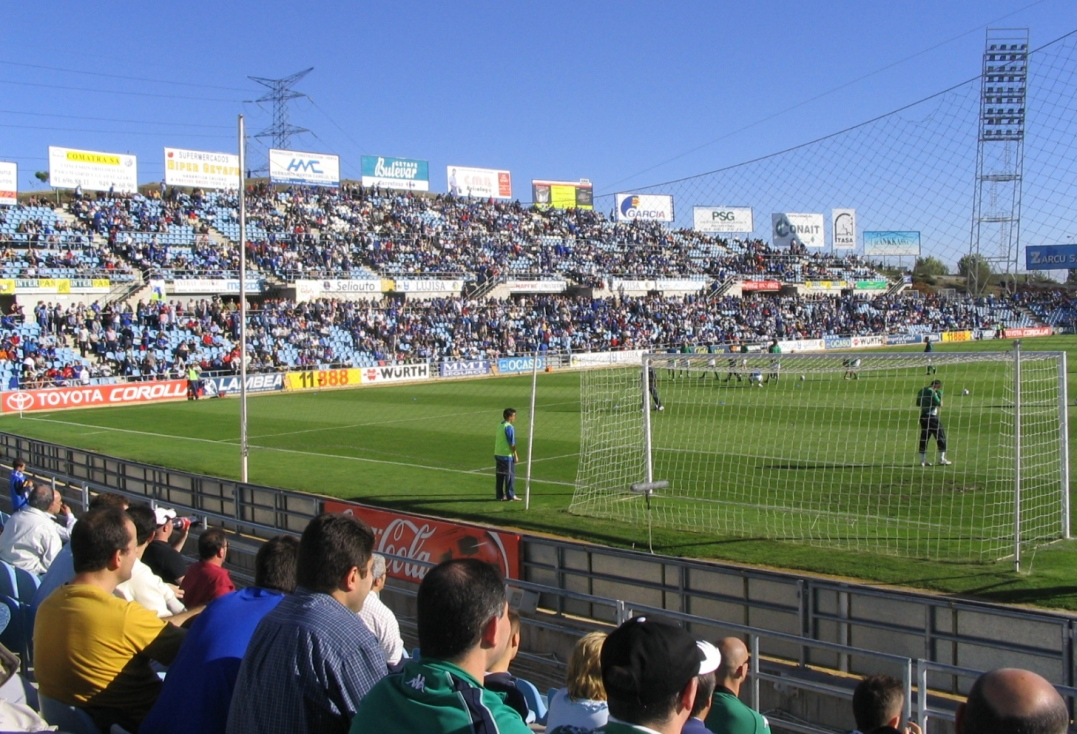
Coliseum Alfonso Pérez.

The major sport in Getafe, much like in the rest of Spain, is football. The local football team is the Getafe CF. On 19 June 2004, the team was promoted to the Spanish first division. On 23 June 2007, the team reached the finals of the Copa del Rey, which were held in the area. In 2015 the team was relegated to second division, but it was promoted again the following year, remaining in the first division since then.

Other popular sports include basketball, tennis, bicycling, and motor sports. During the local festivals every June, the town celebrates the "day of the bicycle" whereupon tens of thousands of locals bike through the streets of Getafe noncompetitively. Another important sports event is the Getafe Marathon, which is held every January and which attracts a large number of athletes.

The city is home to seven sports centers scattered across various neighborhoods. The largest are those of the neighborhoods of San Isidro and Las Margaritas. Getafe also has a skate park, located behind the Conservatorio Profesional de Música de Getafe (musical conservatory), and three municipal pools, which can be found in the neighborhoods of Sector III, Getafe Norte, and Perales del Río. The soccer stadium, Coliseum Alfonso Pérez, is located in the neighborhood of Getafe Norte, and can sit 14,400 spectators. In anticipation of the local soccer team's rise to the first division, the public pool in Getafe Norte was expanded to include a training center.

== Public health ==
Getafe has a good public health system. The city has eleven public healthcare facilities throughout the neighborhoods of Juan de la Cierva, Las Margaritas, La Alhóndiga, Getafe Norte, Sector III, El Bercial, and Perales del Río. The University Hospital of Getafe, opened in the 1990s, is the population's principal healthcare facility. The hospital, located alongside the La Alhóndiga neighborhood, is famous throughout Spain for its care of burn victims. The Apanid, a residential facility specializing in the care of people with Down syndrome, is located on the Prado Acedinos (street), approximately 5 km south of the city center. This facility is the only of its kind in the southern area of the community of Madrid.

== Geography ==
Getafe is home to a number of curiosities and special characteristics rare among other municipalities. Some of these include:

Traditionally, the geographical center of the Iberian Peninsula is located in the Cerro de los Ángeles.

The Perales del Río neighborhood boasts the world's largest population of the common kestrel (Falco tinnunculus).

Getafe's antipodal point is in the southeast of the North Island of New Zealand, 15 km southeast of the agricultural town of Dannevirke.

== Notable people ==
- Alejandro Amenábar (Santiago de Chile, 1972-), film director. He interned at the Colegio La Inmaculada de Los Padres Escolapios de Getafe.
- Jonathan Barragán (1985), former professional motocross racer, winner of 7 Grand Prix and 11 Spanish motocross national championships.
- dEmo (born 1960), sculptor whose works have been displayed from the city hall.
- Achraf Hakimi (Getafe, 1998-), Moroccan football player for Paris Saint Germain
- Silverio Lanza (Madrid, 1856-Getafe, 1912), writer. He retired to live in Getafe in 1887.
- Carmen Machi, Spanish actress.
- Rubén Montesinos, Spanish Taekwondo athlete who won the 2005 World Taekwondo Championships in Heavyweight.
- Roberto García Parrondo, left-handed, professional team handball player on the Spain men's national handball team.
- Francisco Pavón, Retired Spanish footballer who played for Real Zaragoza, as a central defender, and in the past played for Real Madrid.
- Alfonso Pérez Muñoz (Madrid, 1972-), former football player for Betis, Real Madrid, FC Barcelona, and for the Spain national football team. He was born in Madrid and grew up in Getafe.
- Joel Robles, Spanish footballer who currently plays for G.D. Estoril Praia as a goalkeeper.
- Víctor Sánchez, Spanish football right midfielder, currently the manager of Olimpija Ljubljana.
- Lorenzo Silva (Madrid, 1966-), writer. He lived in Getafe during three separate periods: 1966–1971, 1985–1993, and (1994-present).

== Sister cities ==
Getafe is an active participant in the European Union's town twinning initiative. It currently has three sister cities:

- Getafe, Philippines, since 16 November 1990.
- Daïra of Djrafia, Western Sahara, since 11 June 1991
- Guanabacoa, Cuba, since 16 November 1996.

== Panoramic views ==
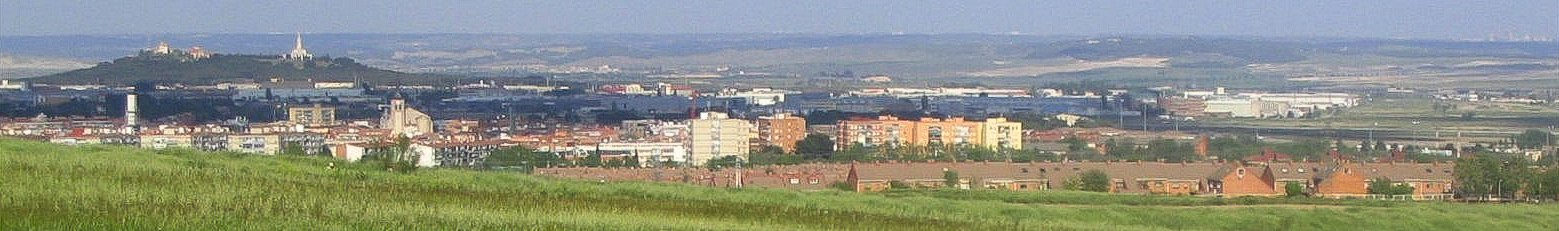
The central neighborhoods of Getafe, with the Cerro de los Ángeles as backdrop. The following are visible from left to right: the tower of town hall (a white tower), the Cathedral of Our Lady of Magdalena, and single family homes from the Sector III neighborhood. Photograph taken from Buenavista hill.

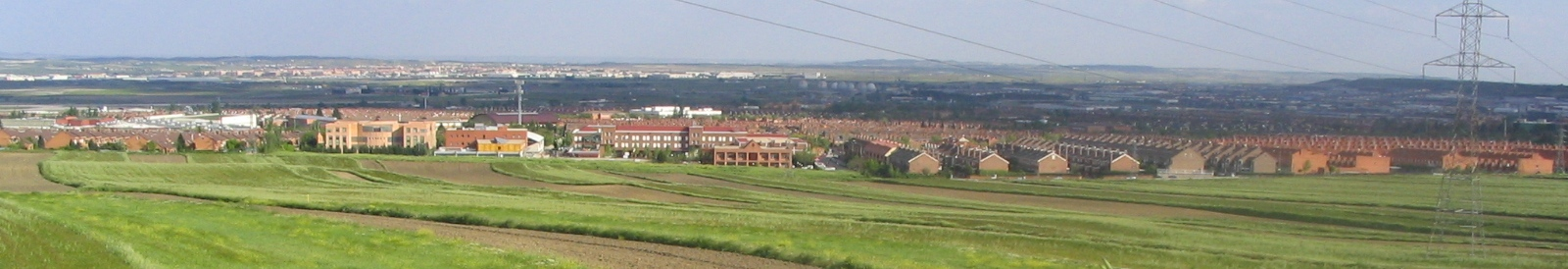
The Sector III neighborhood, as seen from Buenavista hill. The courts, post office, and the Aristos private college are visible in the foreground.

== See also ==
- Madrid Metropolitan Area
- Autonomous Community of Madrid
- Getafe Air Force Base
- Roman Catholic Diocese of Getafe
- Cerro de los Ángeles
- Getafe CF
- Universidad Carlos III de Madrid
