= Estadio Coliseum =

Football stadium in Getafe, Spain

Coliseum
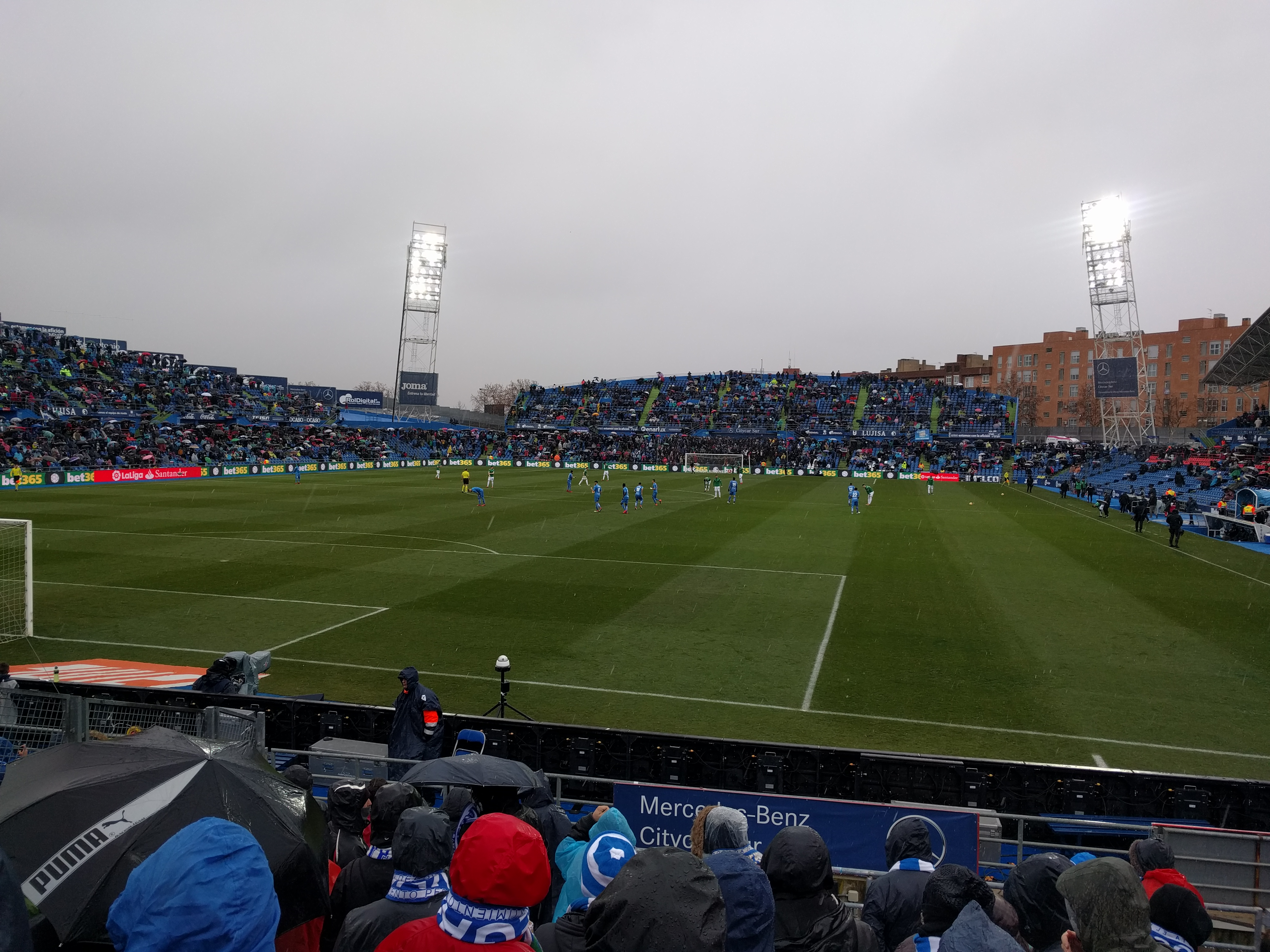
- Match of Primera División, LaLiga 2017-18, Getafe CF 0:0 CD Leganés, Coliseum Alfonso Pérez
- Interactive map of Coliseum
- Former names: Coliseum Alfonso Pérez (1998–2023)
- Location: Getafe, Community of Madrid, Spain
- Coordinates: 40°19′32″N 3°42′53″W
- Owner: Ayuntamiento de Getafe
- Operator: Ayuntamiento de Getafe
- Capacity: 16,500
- Field size: 105 metres (115 yd) x 71 metres (78 yd)
- Public transit: at Los Espartales

Construction
- Opened: 1998
- Renovated: 2025–

Tenants
- Getafe CF (1998–present); Spain national football team (selected matches)

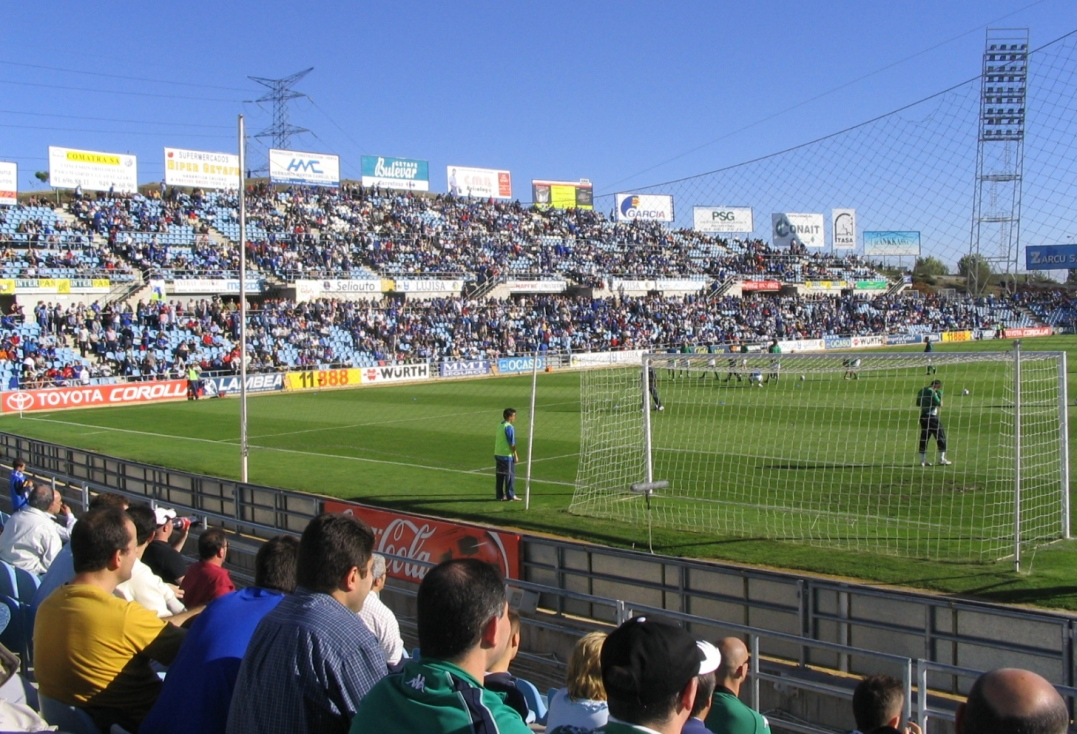
Coliseum Alfonso Pérez

Estadio Coliseum (Spanish pronunciation: [esˈtaðjo koliˈsewn]) is a municipally owned football stadium in Getafe, Spain. It is the home ground of Getafe CF.

== Stadium ==
The stadium was built in 1998 and currently, after several extensions, it has a capacity of 17,393 people, with an average attendance of 10,579 (62.2%) in the 2009/10 season and 9,072 in the 2010/11 season. In the west stand a roof was installed, covering almost all of the stand in order to protect fans from inclement weather. In recent years the average attendance at the Coliseum barely exceeds 9,000 fans.

Getafe CF has played in this stadium since 30 August 1998, when the team from the south of Madrid played their first game against Talavera CF, having left the provisional Estadio Juan de la Cierva where they played only one year, after the demolition of the mythical Estadio Municipal de Las Margaritas. Although Getafe CF played on 30 August, the official opening took place a few days later, on 2 September 1998 with a triangular match that would have Atletico Madrid, Borussia Dortmund and Feyenoord.

In this stadium the Madrid team has experienced the golden age of the club, two ascensions to the Second Division, a promotion to the Primera División, qualifying for two Copa del Rey finals with eliminations in the semi-finals of the Copa del Rey against FC Barcelona and Racing de Santander and a quarter-final of the UEFA Cup against FC Bayern Munich in 2008.

The stadium has also played several friendly matches between national football teams. In May 2010 the Women's UEFA Champions League Final was held at the Coliseum.

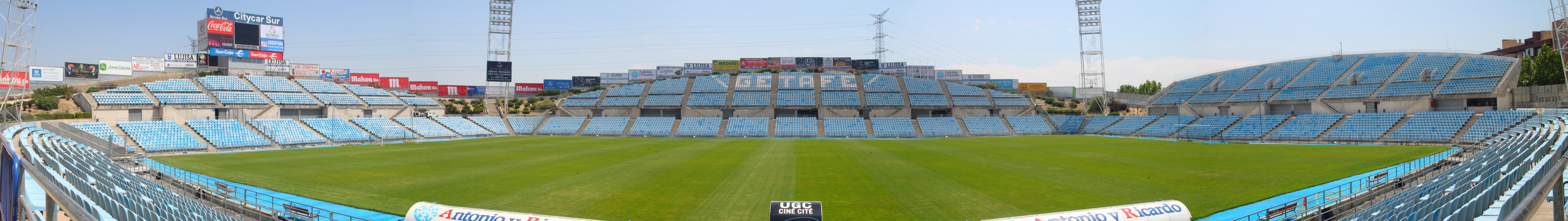
Panoramic view of the stadium from the west stand.

The previous stadium of Getafe was called Estadio de las Margaritas and was located near where today is the University Residence "Fernando de los Ríos", in the Avenida de las Ciudades. It was demolished in 1996 and until the Coliseum was inaugurated the club played in the stadium Juan de la Cierva, in the Avenida de Juan de Borbón.

- Name: Estadio Coliseum
- Inauguration: 1998
- Capacity: 16,500
- Pitch dimensions:
  - Length: 105m
  - Width: 70m

== Renovation ==
Coliseum start redevelopment stadium from 9 June 2025 until 2028.

== Name ==
The stadium was named Coliseum Alfonso Pérez in honour of former Spanish international footballer Alfonso Pérez, who was born and raised in Getafe but only played for the youth side of the club. His name was dropped from the stadium name in 2023 after he made disparaging remarks about female footballers in an interview.

== Notable events ==
- 2010 UEFA Women's Champions League Final

== See also ==
- List of stadiums in Spain
- Lists of stadiums
