= Polideportivo Fernando Martín =

Arena in Fuenlabrada, Spain

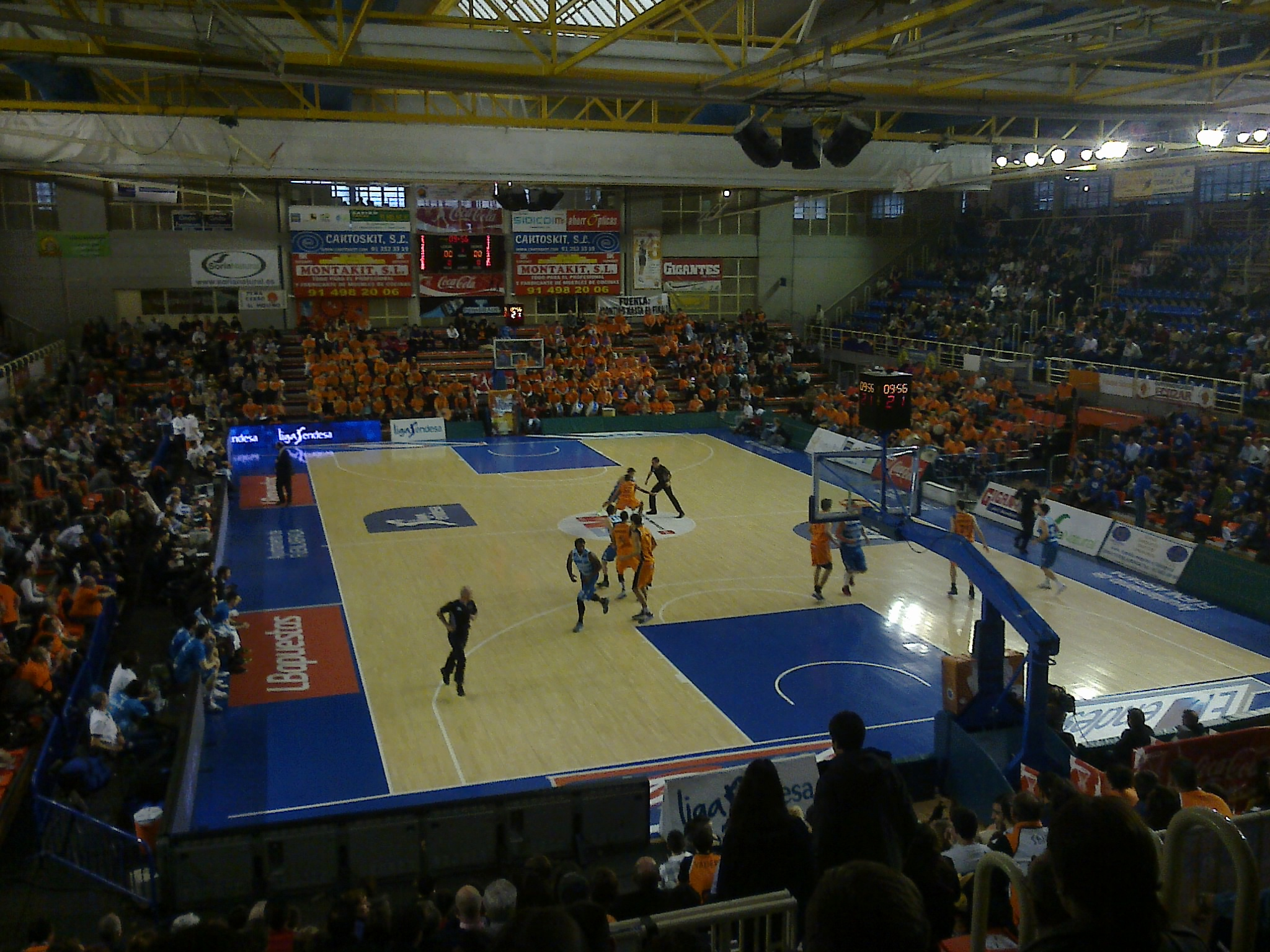
- Interactive map of Polideportivo Fernando Martín
- Location: Fuenlabrada, Spain
- Coordinates: 40°16′57″N 3°48′2″W
- Owner: Fuenlabrada City Hall
- Capacity: 5,700
- Surface: Parquet Floor
- Public transit: at Fuenlabrada Central

Construction
- Opened: 1991

Tenants
- Baloncesto Fuenlabrada (1991–); KK Partizan (1991–1992)

Pabellón Polideportivo Municipal Fernando Martin is an arena in Fuenlabrada, Madrid Province, Spain. Opened in September 1991, and named for the Spanish basketball player Fernando Martín Espina, the arena has a seating capacity for 5,700 people. It is primarily used for basketball and is the home arena of Alta Gestión Fuenlabrada.

During the group stages of 1991–92 Euroleague, the arena was home to Serbian club KK Partizan, which was forbidden by FIBA from playing its home games on home soil due to the war that was starting in SFR Yugoslavia.
