= Fuenlabrada =

- Municipality
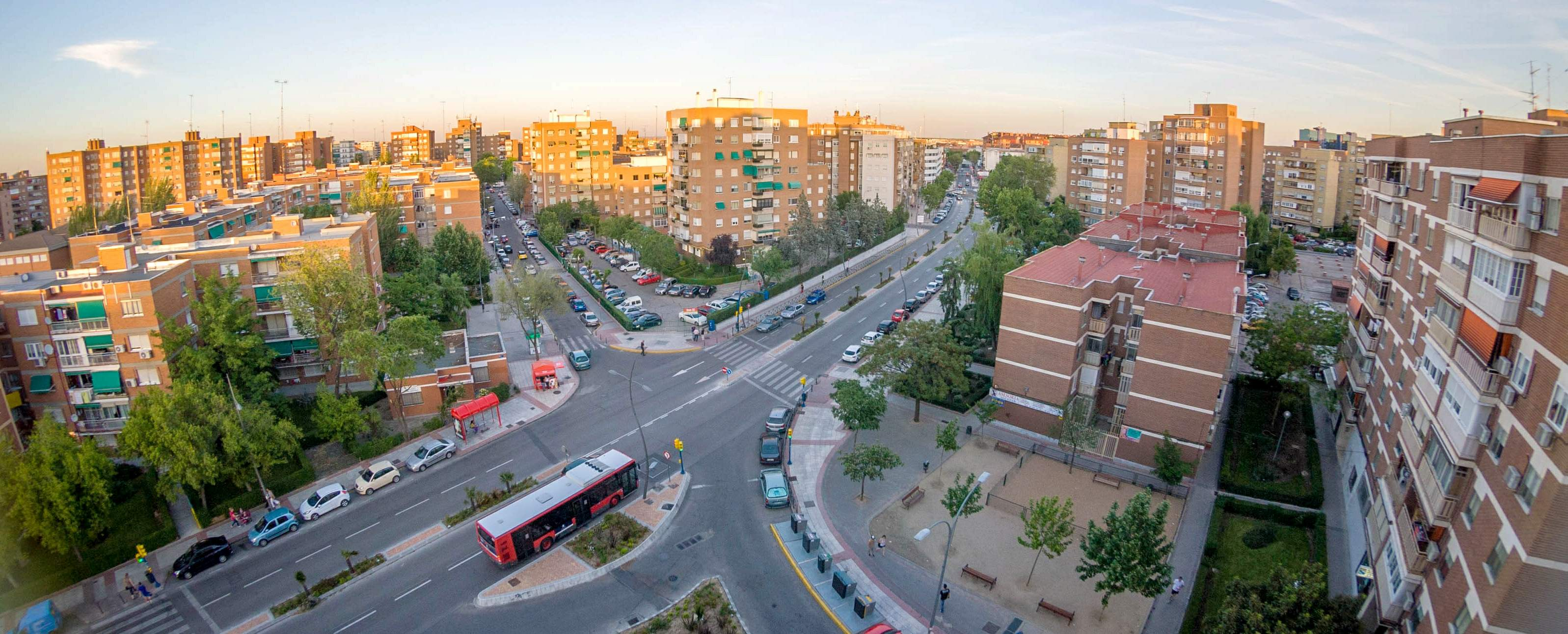

- Flag Coat of arms
- Interactive map of Fuenlabrada
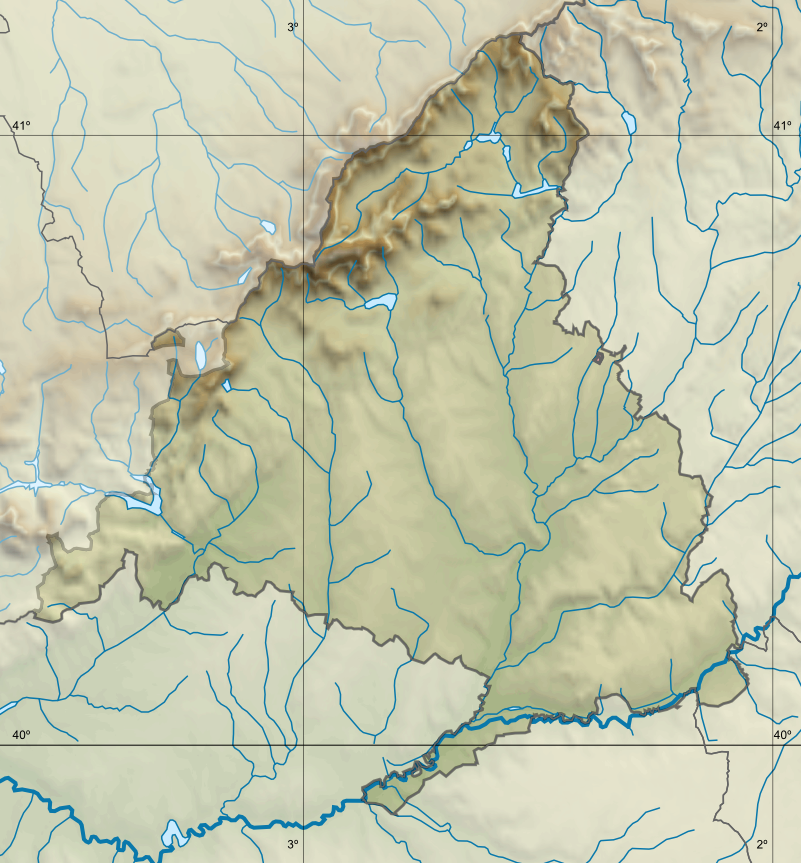
- Location in Spain Fuenlabrada (Community of Madrid)
- Coordinates: 40°17′00″N 3°48′00″W
- Country: Spain
- Region: Community of Madrid

Government
  - Mayor: Javier Ayala (PSOE)

Area
  - Total: 39.41 km^{2} (15.22 sq mi)
- Elevation: 664 m (2,178 ft)

Population (2025)
  - Total: 190,076
  - Density: 4,823/km^{2} (12,490/sq mi)
- Time zone: UTC+1 (CET)
  - Summer (DST): UTC+2 (CEST)
- Postal code: 28940-28947
- Website: www.ayto-fuenlabrada.es

Fuenlabrada (Spanish: [fwenlaˈβɾaða]) is a city and municipality of Spain located in the Community of Madrid. As of 2025, it has a population of 190 076, making it the region's sixth most populated municipality.

== Etymology ==
The etymology of Fuenlabrada comes from the contraction of Fuente Labrada, Spanish for "carved fountain".

== History ==
There are archeological sites tracing back the human presence in the area to the Paleolithic (La Cantueña) and the Bronze Age (Casas del Cerro). Other settlements in the current municipal area, including Loranca, Albas and Fregacedos, existed during the Upper Middle Ages.

The founding of the village of Fuenlabrada has been tentatively traced to the late 14th century, populated by the dwellers of the nearby settlements of Loranca, Albas and Fregacedos, which had been simultaneously depopulated. The first mention of Fuenlabrada, which by the early 16th century was part of the Land of Madrid, was recorded later in the century, during the reign of Philip II, in the so-called Topographic Relations of Philip II. The village suffered the loss of a quarter of the population in the second half of the 18th century.

While the agricultural sector of the economy remained dominant, the making of rosquillas and buns in the municipality became renowned among the surrounding towns by the end of the 19th century. Following the end of the 1936–1939 Civil War, in which some parts of Fuenlabrada endured serious damage, the Dirección General de Regiones Devastadas undertook some building works in the municipality during the 1940s and 1950s.

The population experienced a demographic explosion in the 1970s, going from 7,369 inhabitants in 1970 to 65,181 in 1980, the biggest relative increase in Spain in that period. The demographic growth continued in the ensuing decades.

Since the 1979 municipal elections, the municipality has been a stronghold of the Spanish Socialist Workers' Party (PSOE) and has been part of the so-called "red belt" of the Community of Madrid.

== Geography ==
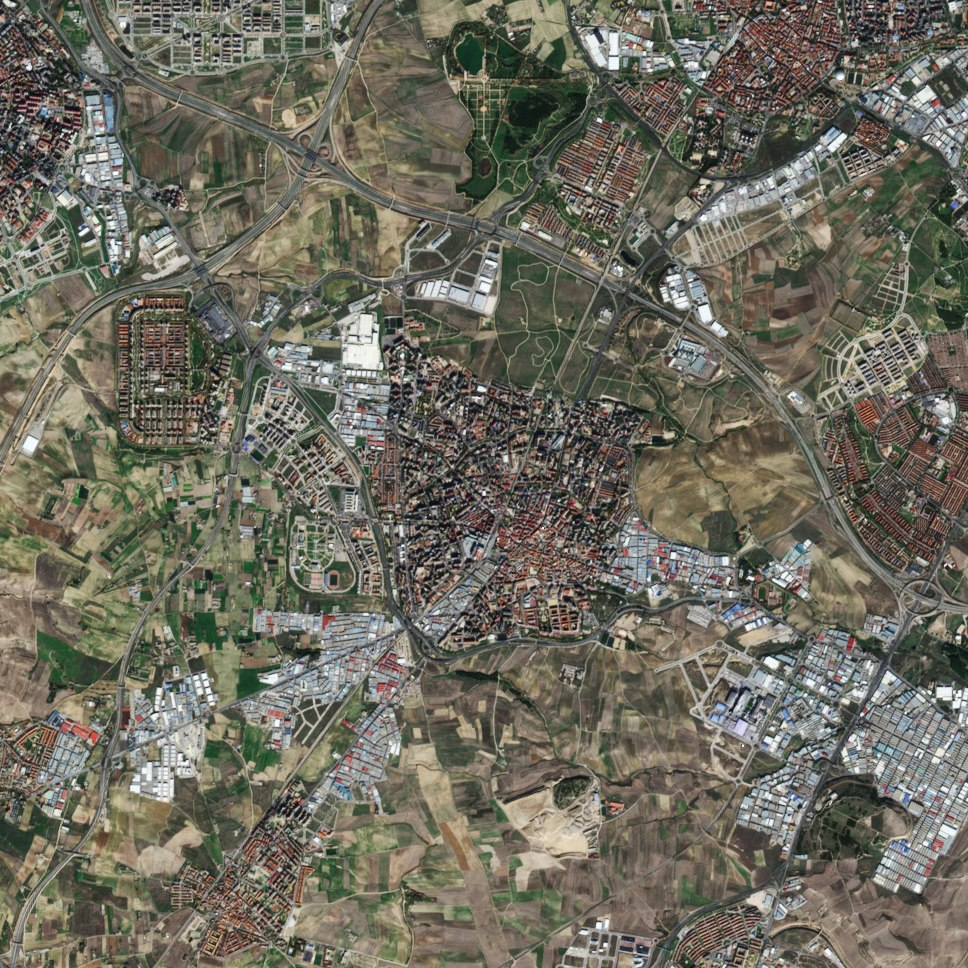
Fuenlabrada as seen by the European Space Agency's Sentinel-2.

The highest point in the municipality (721 metres above sea level) is located in a hill to the northwest of the city proper. The city proper's altitude gently decreases from the Northwest to the Southeast; the lowest areas in the municipality (slightly over 600 metres above sea level) are located in the East, past the A-42 near the border with Getafe.

The southeast of the municipality is covered by the Polígono Cobo Calleja, a huge economic area overwhelmingly dedicated to the wholesale distribution of Chinese imports (considered the biggest one in Europe in the latter regard).

The residential area of Loranca (203.6 ha in size) lies in the west, near Móstoles, semi-detached from the main urban nucleus by the M-407 highway.

The main hydrographic feature is the Arroyo Culebro, a tributary of the Manzanares. Other parts of the municipality (including the Arroyo de Fregacedos) are however part of the Guadarrama catchment area.

== Demographics ==
Historical population
Year	Pop.	±%
1842	2,903	—
1857	2,217	−23.6%
1877	2,326	+4.9%
1887	2,253	−3.1%
1900	2,212	−1.8%
1910	2,257	+2.0%
1920	2,189	−3.0%
1930	2,362	+7.9%
1940	1,722	−27.1%
1950	2,107	+22.4%
1960	2,816	+33.6%
1970	7,369	+161.7%
1981	78,096	+959.8%
1991	144,723	+85.3%
2001	182,705	+26.2%
2011	196,986	+7.8%
2021	192,612	−2.2%
Source: INE

Fuenlabrada witnessed a dramatic population explosion in the 1980s, due to large scale immigration of young workers coming from the capital city and other agrarian regions (chiefly Extremadura, Castilla-La Mancha, Andalusia and Galicia) seeking affordable prices in housing. By 1975, the municipality had already reached a population of 18,442. Foreign workers have also settled in the city, most of them coming from Latin America, Africa, the Maghreb, China and Romania.

== Politics and government ==
Mayors

Throughout its modern democratic history, the municipality of Fuenlabrada has been always ruled by the Spanish Socialist Workers' Party of the Community of Madrid, belonging to the so-called "red belt" of the region.

List of Mayors
Term	Name	Party
1979–1983	Manuel de la Rocha	PSOE–M
1983–2002	José Quintana Viar	PSOE–M
2002–2018	Manuel Robles Delgado	PSOE–M
2018–present	Francisco Javier Ayala	PSOE–M

== Transport ==
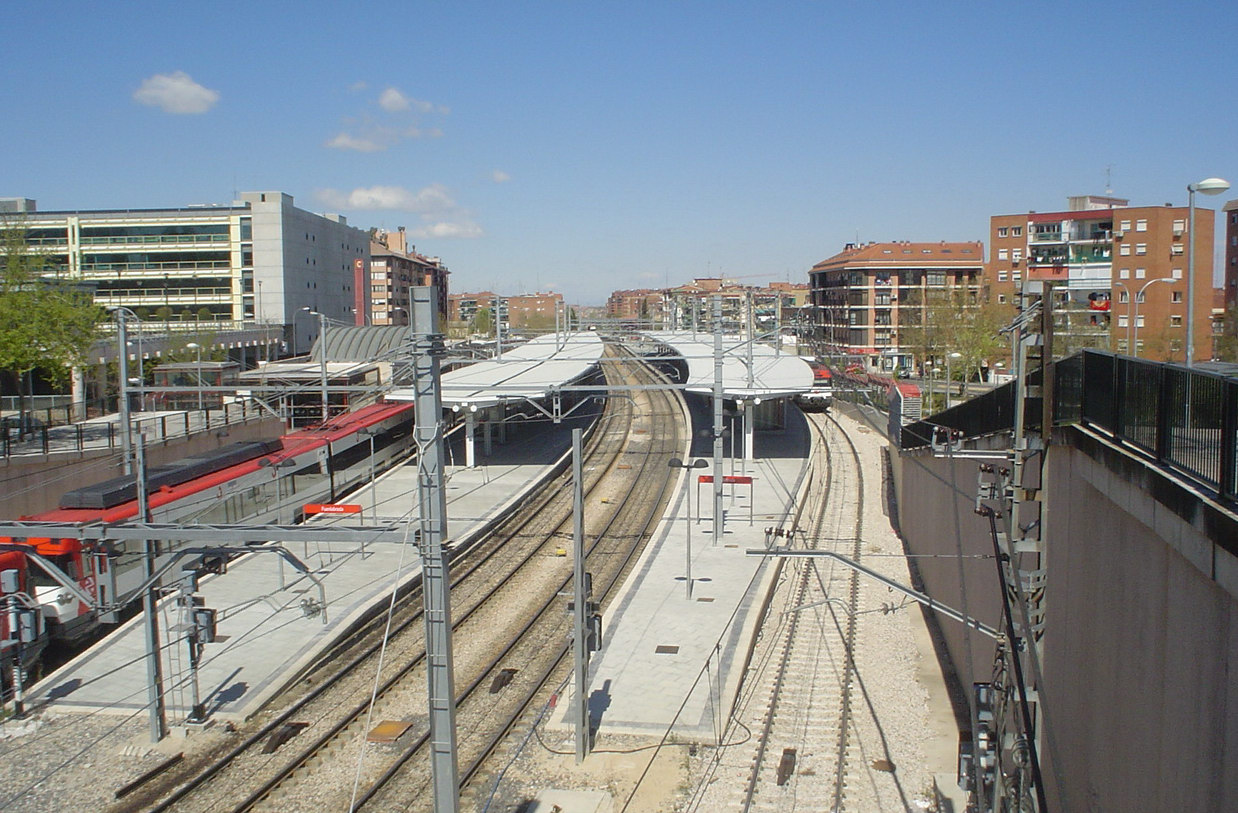
Fuenlabrada Central Railway (and Metro) Station.

=== Roads ===
The city is linked with the M-50, A-42, M-506, M-407 and M-409 highways. It is connected as well to the neighbouring towns of Humanes de Madrid and Moraleja de Enmedio through the M-413 and M-405 local roads, respectively.

=== Metro ===
Fuenlabrada has good transport connections with Madrid, Móstoles, Getafe, Alcorcón and Leganés through the Madrid Metro line 12 (also known as Metrosur), including five stations: Loranca, Hospital de Fuenlabrada, Parque Europa, Fuenlabrada Central (transfer with Fuenlabrada Cercanías station) and Parque de los Estados.

=== Trains ===
Fuenlabrada is connected to Madrid via the Cercanías Madrid line C-5, a commuter train service, having two stations: Fuenlabrada (Transfer with Fuenlabrada Central metro station) and La Serna.

== Education ==
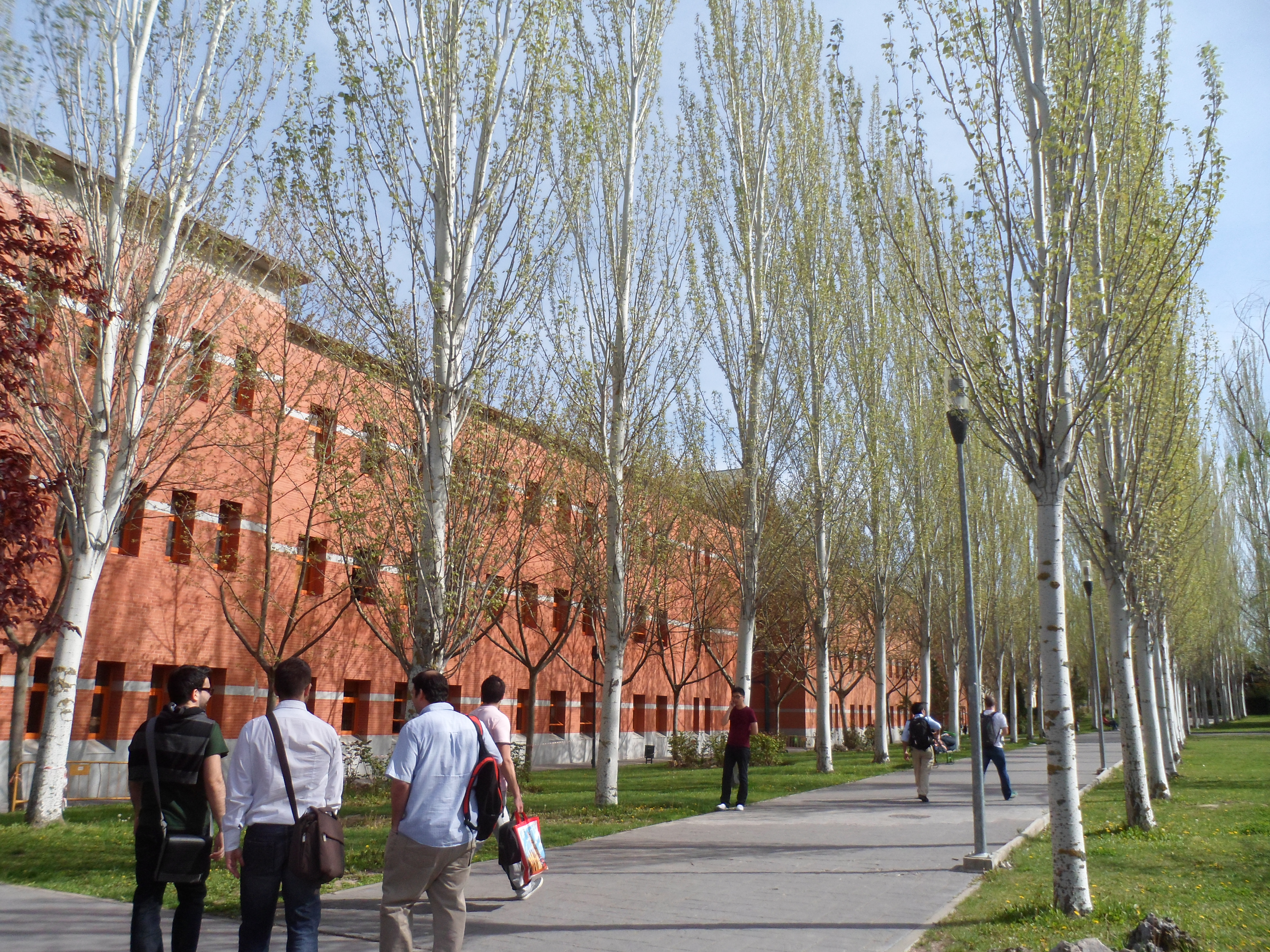
URJC Faculty of Law and Social Sciences

=== Primary and Secondary education ===
Fuenlabrada has 33 kindergarten and daycare centers, 50 primary schools and 15 secondary schools.

=== Higher education ===
The Universidad Rey Juan Carlos (URJC) has a secondary campus in the city, housing the faculties of communication sciences, telecommunications engineering, tourism, business administration, among other courses.

The National University of Distance Education (UNED) also has a branch here.

== Sports ==
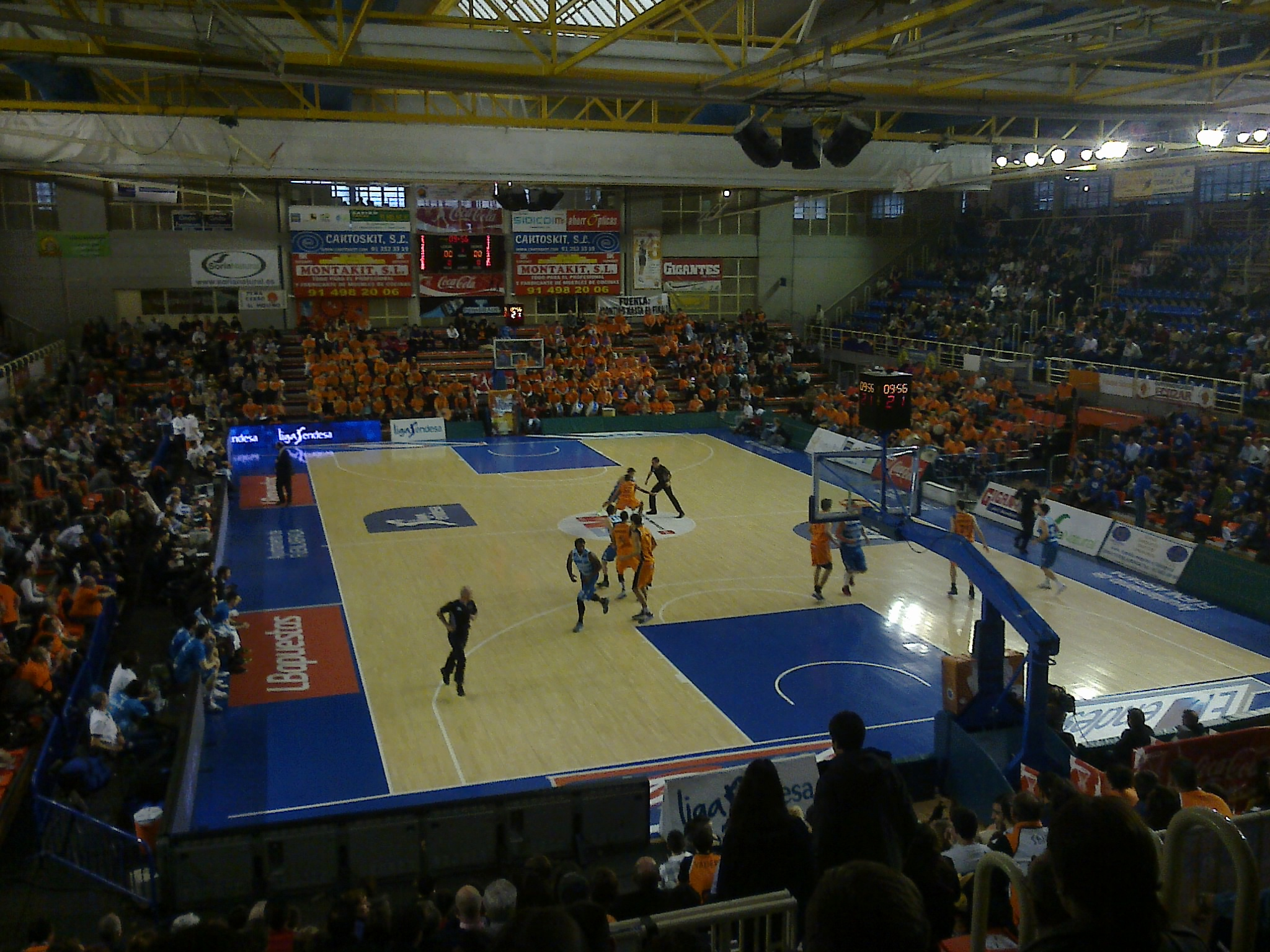
Polideportivo Fernando Martín

The city is home to basketball team Partizan de la Fuenlabrada, currently playing in the first tier division (Liga ACB), having competed in the top flight division of Spanish basketball for several years. Their home games are played at Fernando Martín sports centre, which has a capacity of 5,700.

CF Fuenlabrada is the local football team, playing in Primera Federación (third tier in Spanish league). They play as home team at the Estadio Fernando Torres, inaugurated by the footballer's parents on 1 September 2011. The stadium has a capacity of 7,500.

Due to Yugoslav Wars, Partizan had to play abroad as the host in the 1991/1992 season. The management of the club decided to "host" in the Madrid suburb of Fuenlabrada, and that season they became champions of the old continent.

== Twin towns – sister cities ==
- San Juan del Río Coco, Nicaragua (since 1988)
- Joal-Fadiouth, Senegal (since 1999)

== Notable people ==
- Roberto Jiménez (born 1986), former professional footballer
- Fernando Torres (born 1984), former professional footballer and current manager of Atlético Madrid B.
- Supremme de Luxe (born 1979), actor, singer, cabaret artist, drag queen and television personality.
