= Alcorcón Central (Madrid Metro) =

Madrid Metro station

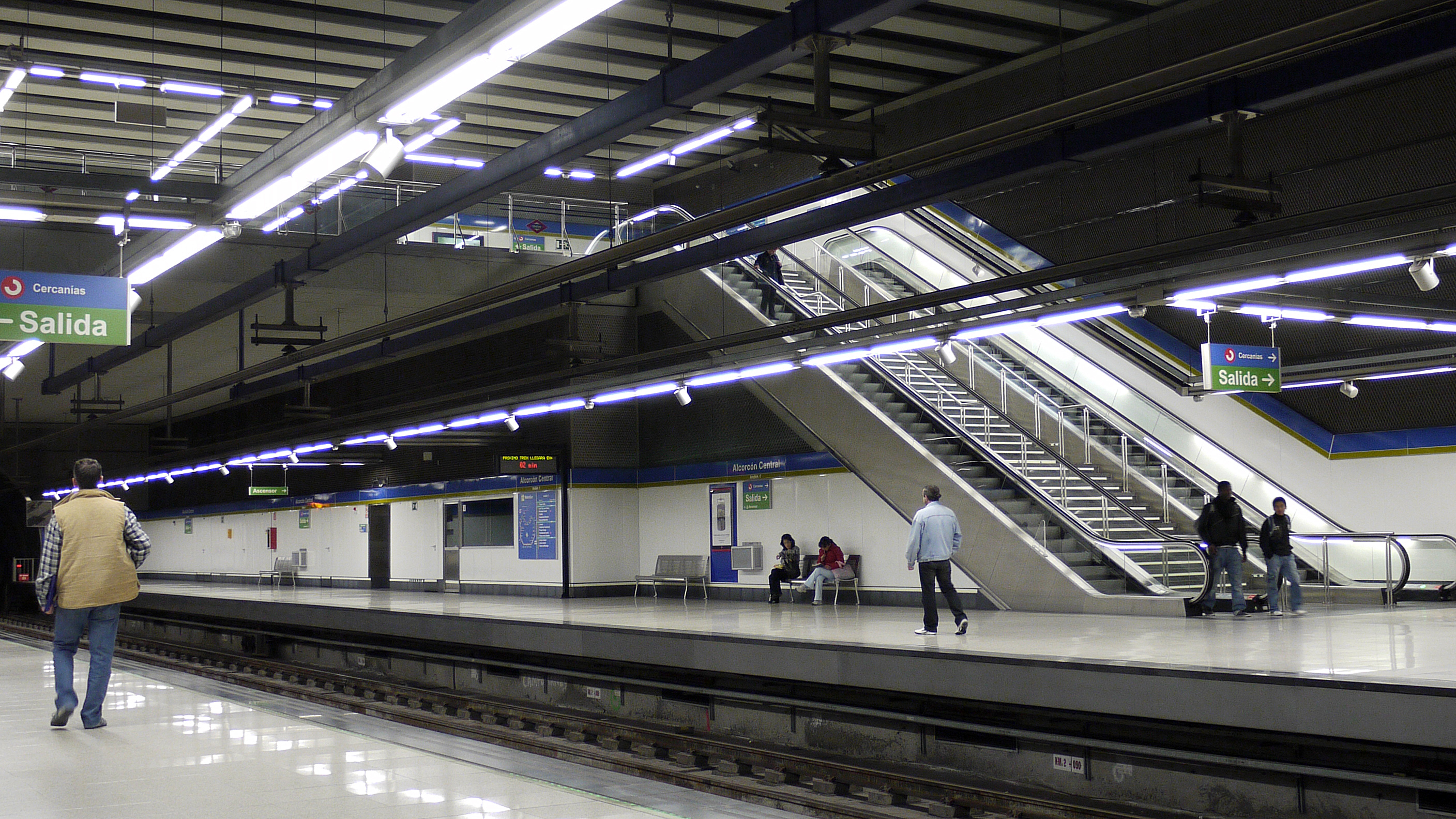

General information
- Location: Alcorcón, Community of Madrid; Spain
- Coordinates: 40.3500868°N 3.8317739°W
- System: Madrid Metro station
- Owner: CRTM
- Operator: CRTM

Construction
- Accessible: Yes

Other information
- Fare zone: B1

History
- Opened: 11 April 2003; 23 years ago

Services
| Preceding station | Madrid Metro | Following station |
|---|---|---|
| Parque Lisboa clockwise / outer | Line 12 | Parque Oeste anticlockwise / inner |
Out of system interchange
| Preceding station | Cercanías Madrid | Following station |
| Las Retamas towards Móstoles-El Soto | C-5 | San José de Valderas towards Humanes |
Location
- Location within Madrid

Alcorcón or Alcorcón Central ([alkoɾˈkon θenˈtɾal], "Central Alcorcón") is a station in the Community of Madrid. It is on Line 12 of the Madrid Metro. It is located in fare Zone B1. The station offers connection to Cercanías Madrid via Alcorcón railway station.
