= Line 12 (Madrid Metro) =

Rapid transit line of the Madrid Metro

Coordinates: 40.3347°N 3.7525°W

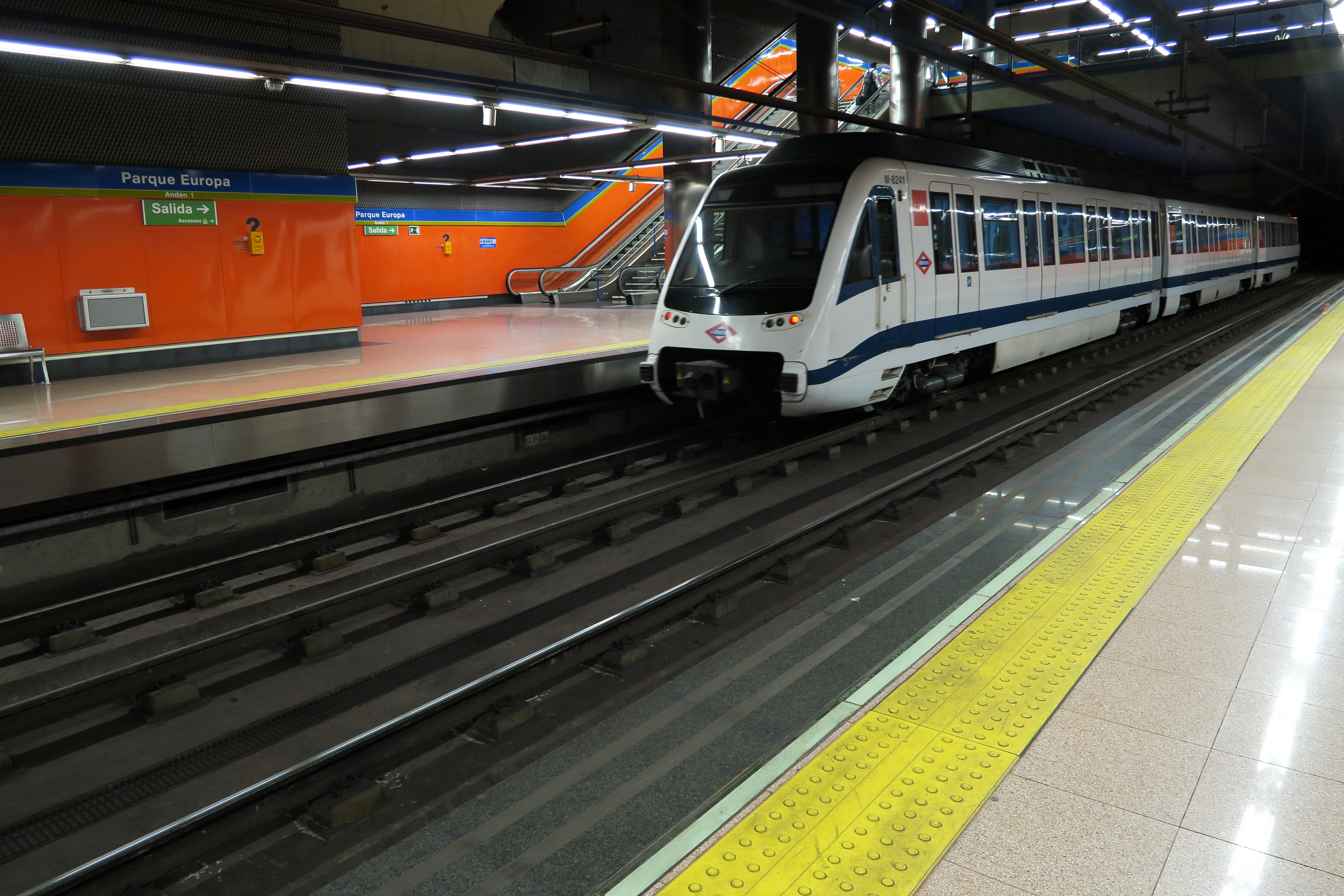
- A Class 8000 train at Parque Europa station

Overview
- Other name: MetroSur
- Native name: Línea 12
- Owner: CRTM
- Locale: Community of Madrid
- Stations: 28
- Website: www.metromadrid.es/en/linea/linea-12-metrosur

Service
- Type: Rapid transit
- System: Madrid Metro
- Operator: CRTM

History
- Opened: 11 April 2003; 23 years ago

Technical
- Line length: 40.6 km (25.2 mi)
- Character: circle line, underground rail
- Track gauge: 1,445 mm (4 ft 8 7/8 in)

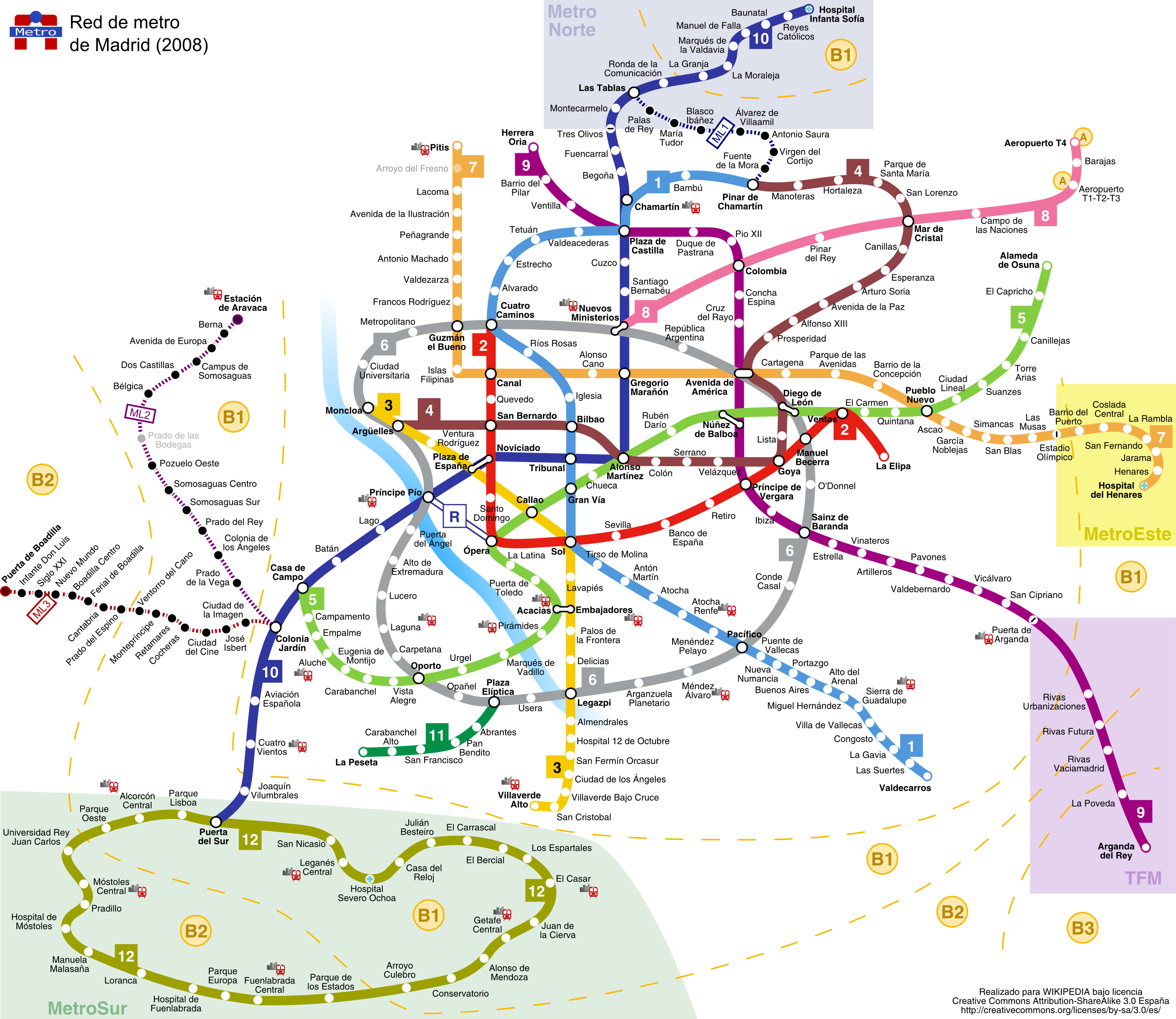
Map of the Madrid Metro system; Line 12 is in the lower left.

Line 12, also known as MetroSur (Spanish for "MetroSouth"), is a circle line of the Madrid Metro inaugurated on 11 April 2003. Line 12 is a circular line; it is the only route of the Madrid Metro that is completely outside the city of Madrid (as well as fare zone A). The line connects five suburban towns southwest of the city, serving around one million people. The towns linked by Line 12 are Alcorcón, Leganés, Getafe, Fuenlabrada and Móstoles. Despite parts of the line running through uninhabited territory, there are no above-ground sections in an effort to facilitate future urban development.

At a total length of 40.6 km (25.2 mi), it is the longest line in the network and even more extensive than Lines 9 and 10 with their appendages to the north and south. Despite this, Line 12 accumulated only about 32 million trips in 2018, down from 34.8 million in the previous year, making it the only line to lose users in that time and the third least used after the yet-to-be-completed Line 11 and the airport connection Line 8. This decrease was mainly caused by renovation works necessitating the temporary closure of sections of the line.

The line interchanges two lines of the Madrid Metro at two stations: With Line 10 at Puerta del Sur and with Line 3 at El Casar.

MetroSur is one of the longest tunnels in the world. At the time of its opening it was the second longest fully underground subway in Europe. As of 2024 it remains the longest subway tunnel in the European Union.

== Rolling stock ==
Line 12 uses CAF's 8000 and AnsaldoBreda's 9000 series in MRM composition. Both series use a three-car train, as there is not enough demand for additional cars. Up to three extra coaches per train can be ordered.

== Future ==
There are plans to build two new stations: "Fuenlabrada Oeste" between Loranca and Hospital de Fuenlabrada, and secondly "Fuenlabrada Este" between Arroyo Culebro and Parque de los Estados. No completion dates for these new stations have been given, as they are still in the planning stage.

== Stations ==
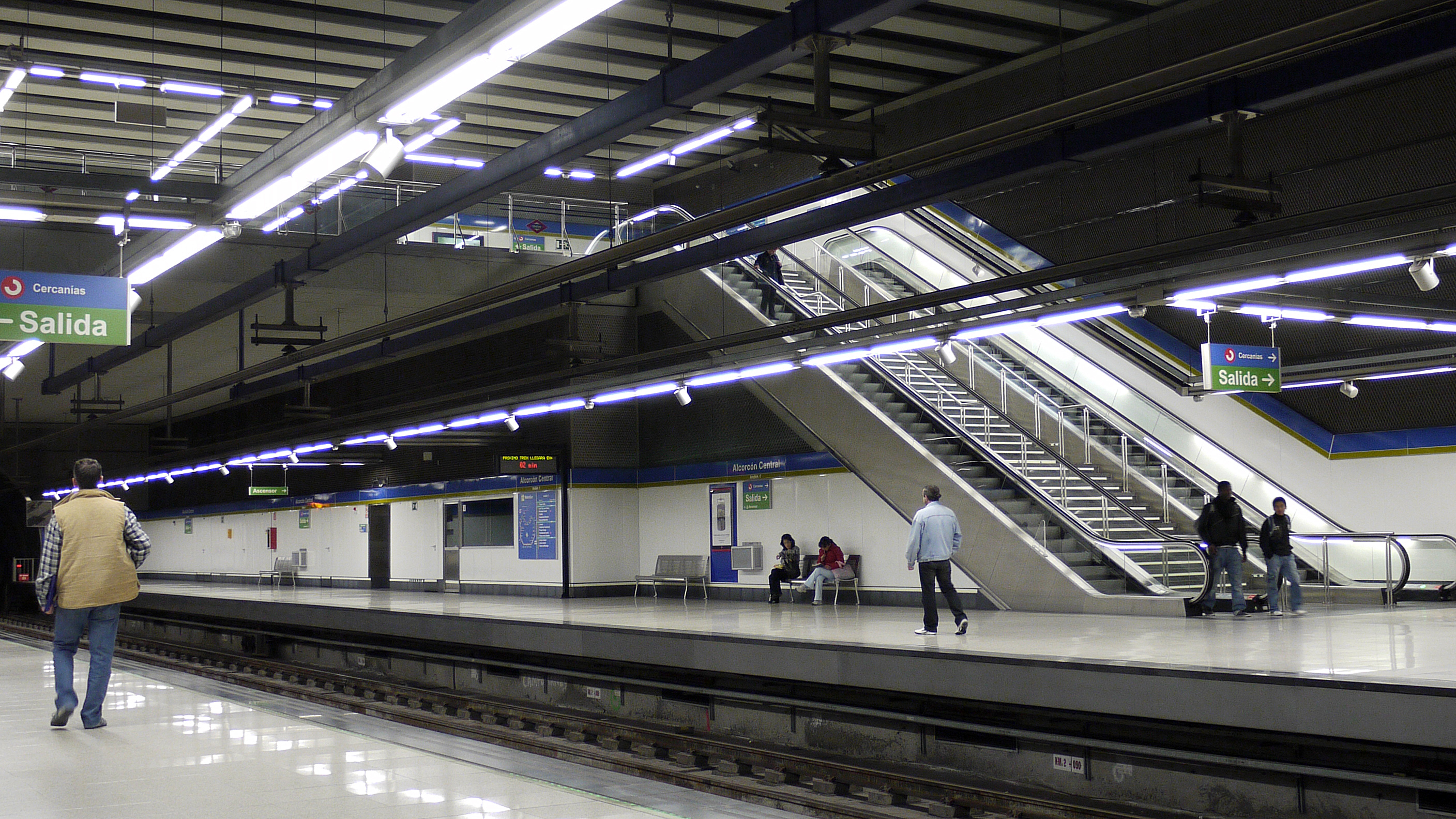
Alcorcón Central Metro Station

Line 12 stations have elements of art, such as the murals in the Hospital Severo Ochoa Station honoring the Nobel Prize winning biochemist, Severo Ochoa. Surface level stations are covered by massive roofs, with some glass to allow daylight – a similar system is used in Copenhagen Metro and Prague Metro systems.

Municipality	Station	Opened	Zone	Connections
Alcorcón	Puerta del Sur	2003	B1	Madrid Metro:
Alcorcón	Parque Lisboa	2003	B1	
Alcorcón	Alcorcón Central	2003	B1	Cercanías Madrid:
Alcorcón	Parque Oeste	2003	B1	
Móstoles	Universidad Rey Juan Carlos	2003	B2	
Móstoles	Móstoles Central	2003	B2	Cercanías Madrid:
Móstoles	Pradillo	2003	B2	
Móstoles	Hospital de Móstoles	2003	B2	
Móstoles	Manuela Malasaña	2003	B2	
Fuenlabrada	Loranca	2003	B2	
Fuenlabrada	Hospital de Fuenlabrada	2003	B2	
Fuenlabrada	Parque Europa	2003	B2	
Fuenlabrada	Fuenlabrada Central	2003	B2	Cercanías Madrid:
Fuenlabrada	Parque de los Estados	2003	B2	
Getafe	Arroyo Culebro	2003	B1	
Getafe	Conservatorio	2003	B1	
Getafe	Alonso de Mendoza	2003	B1	
Getafe	Getafe Central	2003	B1	Cercanías Madrid:
Getafe	Juan de la Cierva	2003	B1	
Getafe	El Casar	2003	B1	Cercanías Madrid: Madrid Metro:
Getafe	Los Espartales	2003	B1	
Getafe	El Bercial	2003	B1	
Leganés	El Carrascal	2003	B1	
Leganés	Julián Besteiro	2003	B1	
Leganés	Casa del Reloj	2003	B1	
Leganés	Hospital Severo Ochoa	2003	B1	
Leganés	Leganés Central	2003	B1	Cercanías Madrid:
Leganés	San Nicasio	2003	B1	

== See also ==
- Madrid
- Transport in Madrid
- List of Madrid Metro stations
- List of metro systems
