= Parque Lisboa (Madrid Metro) =

Madrid Metro station

- Platform of the station

General information
- Location: Alcorcón, Madrid; Spain
- Coordinates: 40.3496848°N 3.8211949°W
- System: Madrid Metro station
- Owner: CRTM
- Operator: CRTM

Construction
- Accessible: yes

Other information
- Fare zone: B1

History
- Opened: 11 April 2003; 23 years ago

Services
Preceding station	Madrid Metro	Following station
Puerta del Sur clockwise / outer	Line 12	Alcorcón Central anticlockwise / inner
Location
- Location within Madrid

Parque Lisboa [ˈpaɾke lisˈβoa] is a station on Line 12 of the Madrid Metro, named for the nearby Parque de Lisboa ("Lisbon Park"). It is located in fare Zone B1.
