= Parque de los Estados (Madrid Metro) =

Madrid Metro station

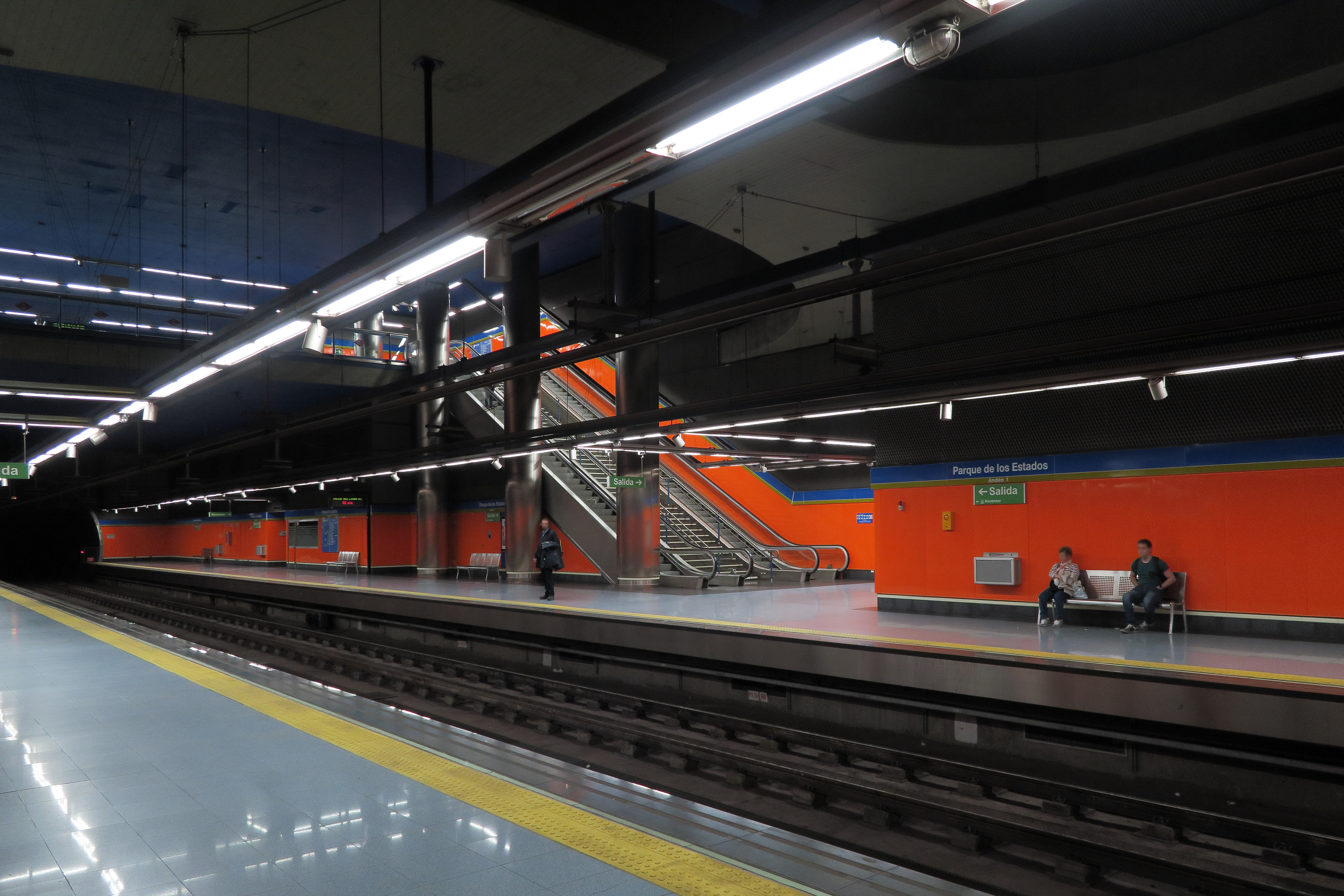
- Platforms of the station

General information
- Location: Fuenlabrada, Madrid; Spain
- Coordinates: 40.2868401°N 3.7869774°W
- System: Madrid Metro station
- Owner: CRTM
- Operator: CRTM

Construction
- Accessible: yes

Other information
- Fare zone: B2

History
- Opened: 11 April 2003; 23 years ago

Services
Preceding station	Madrid Metro	Following station
Fuenlabrada Central clockwise / outer	Line 12	Arroyo Culebro anticlockwise / inner
Location
- Location within Community of Madrid

Parque de los Estados [ˈpaɾke ðe los esˈtaðos] is a station on Line 12 of the Madrid Metro, named for the nearby park ("Park of the Estates"). It is located in fare Zone B2.
