= Julián Besteiro (Madrid Metro) =

Madrid Metro station

- Platform of the station

General information
- Location: Leganés, Community of Madrid; Spain
- Coordinates: 40.3347449°N 3.7526625°W
- System: Madrid Metro station
- Owner: CRTM
- Operator: CRTM

Construction
- Accessible: yes

Other information
- Fare zone: B1

History
- Opened: 11 April 2003; 23 years ago

Services
Preceding station	Madrid Metro	Following station
El Carrascal clockwise / outer	Line 12	Casa del Reloj anticlockwise / inner
Location
- Location within Madrid

Julián Besteiro [xuˈljam besˈtejɾo] is a station on Line 12 of the Madrid Metro, located next to the Civic Center Julián Besteiro in Leganés, which is named for the socialist politician Julián Besteiro (1870–1940). It is located in fare Zone B1.
