= Alonso de Mendoza (Madrid Metro) =

Madrid Metro station

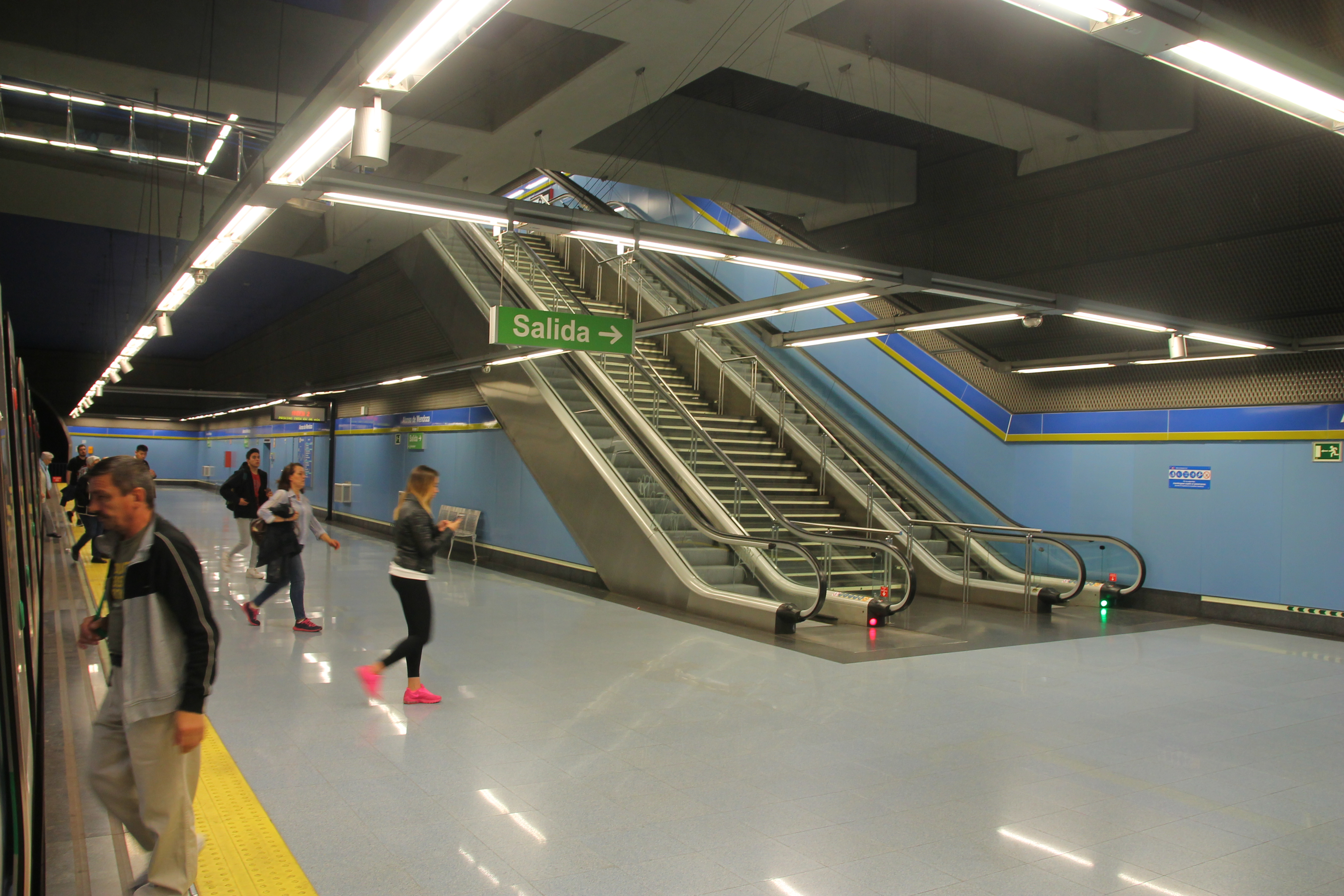
- Platform of the station

General information
- Location: Getafe, Madrid; Spain
- Coordinates: 40.3008112°N 3.7366366°W
- System: Madrid Metro station
- Owner: CRTM
- Operator: CRTM

Construction
- Accessible: yes

Other information
- Fare zone: B1

History
- Opened: 11 April 2003; 23 years ago

Services
Preceding station	Madrid Metro	Following station
Conservatorio clockwise / outer	Line 12	Getafe Central anticlockwise / inner
Location
- Location within Community of Madrid

Alonso de Mendoza [aˈlonso ðe menˈdoθa] is a station on Line 12 of the Madrid Metro, named for the nearby Calle Alonso de Mendoza (named in turn for the conquistador Alonso de Mendoza). It is located in fare Zone B1.
