= Pradillo (Madrid Metro) =

Madrid Metro station

- Platforms of the station

General information
- Location: Móstoles, Madrid; Spain
- Coordinates: 40.3216815°N 3.8648885°W
- System: Madrid Metro station
- Owner: CRTM
- Operator: CRTM

Construction
- Accessible: yes

Other information
- Fare zone: B2

History
- Opened: 11 April 2003; 23 years ago

Services
Preceding station	Madrid Metro	Following station
Móstoles Central clockwise / outer	Line 12	Hospital de Móstoles anticlockwise / inner
Location
- Location within Community of Madrid

Pradillo [pɾaˈðiʝo] is a station on Line 12 of the Madrid Metro, located near the Plaza del Pradillo ("Meadow Square") in Móstoles. It is located in fare Zone B2.
