= Getafe Central (Madrid Metro) =

Madrid Metro station

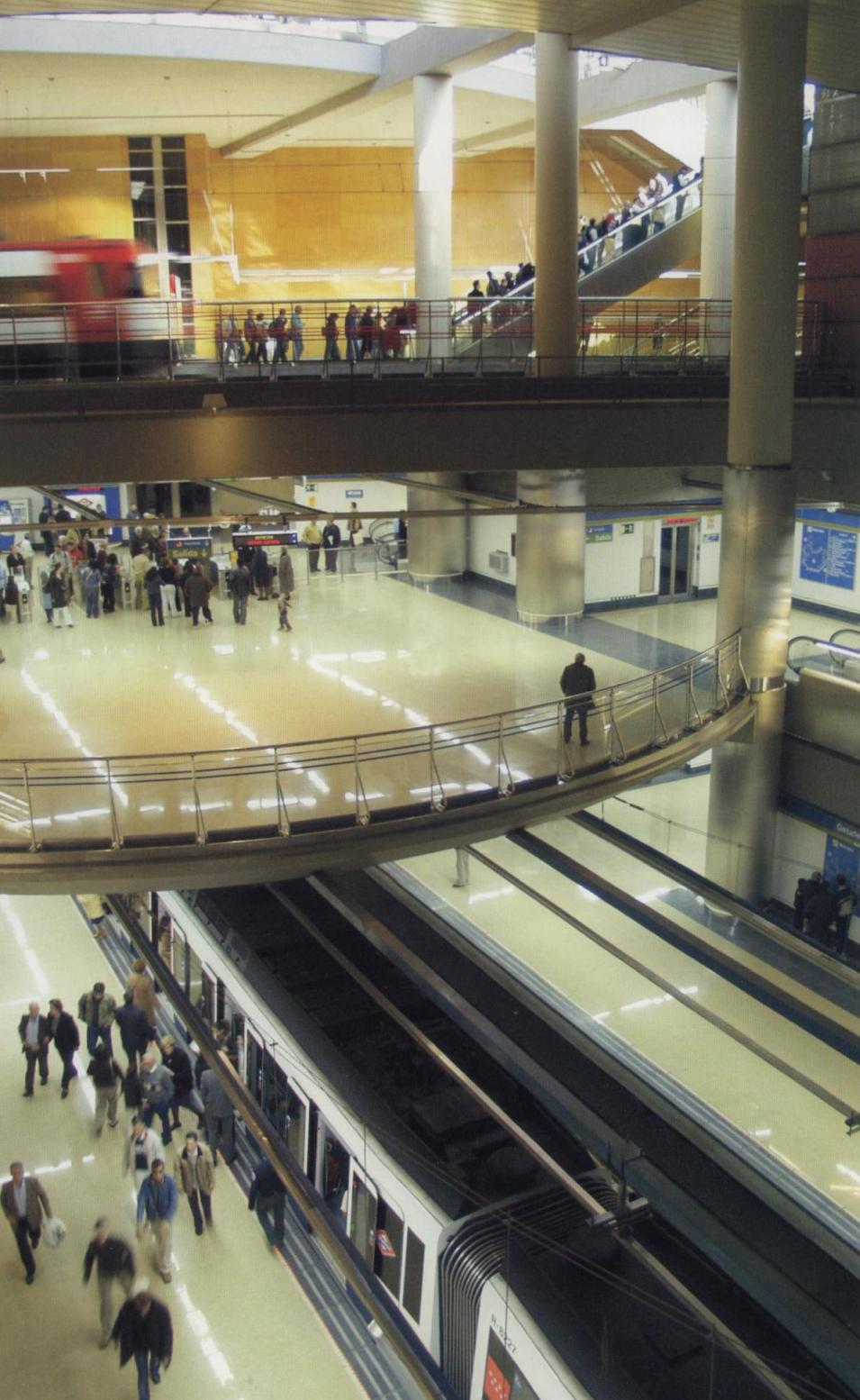

General information
- Location: Getafe, Community of Madrid; Spain
- Coordinates: 40.3099271°N 3.7340288°W
- System: Madrid Metro station
- Owner: CRTM
- Operator: CRTM

Construction
- Accessible: yes

Other information
- Fare zone: B1

History
- Opened: 11 April 2003; 23 years ago

Services
Preceding station	Madrid Metro	Following station
Alonso de Mendoza clockwise / outer	Line 12	Juan de la Cierva anticlockwise / inner
Out of system interchange
Preceding station	Cercanías Madrid	Following station
Las Margaritas Universidad towards Alcobendas-San Sebastián de los Reyes or Colmenar Viejo	C-4	Getafe Sector 3 towards Parla
Location
- Location within Community of Madrid

Getafe Central ([xeˈtafe θenˈtɾal], "Central Getafe") is a station on Line 12 of the Madrid Metro. It is located in fare Zone B1. The station offers connection to Cercanías Madrid via Getafe Centro railway station.
