= Universidad Rey Juan Carlos (Madrid Metro) =

Madrid Metro station

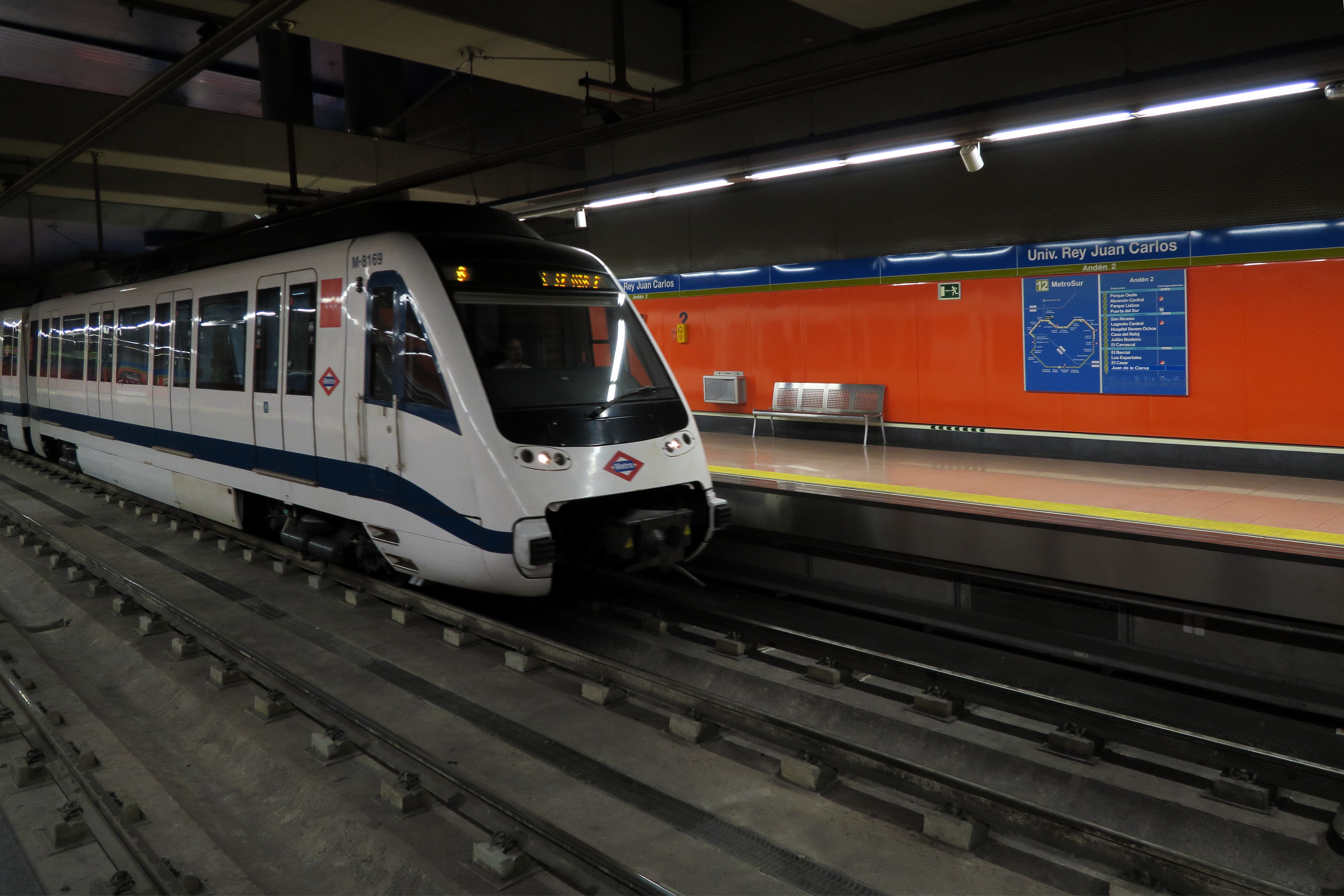
- Platforms of the station

General information
- Location: Móstoles, Community of Madrid; Spain
- Coordinates: 40.3351225°N 3.8721822°W
- System: Madrid Metro station
- Owner: CRTM
- Operator: CRTM

Construction
- Accessible: yes

Other information
- Fare zone: B2

History
- Opened: 11 April 2003; 23 years ago

Services
Preceding station	Madrid Metro	Following station
Parque Oeste clockwise / outer	Line 12	Móstoles Central anticlockwise / inner
Location
- Location within Community of Madrid

Universidad Rey Juan Carlos [uniβeɾsiˈðað ˈrej ˈxwaŋ ˈkaɾlos] is a station on Line 12 of the Madrid Metro, serving the Móstoles campus of King Juan Carlos University. It is located in fare Zone B2.
