= Parque Europa (Madrid Metro) =

Madrid Metro station

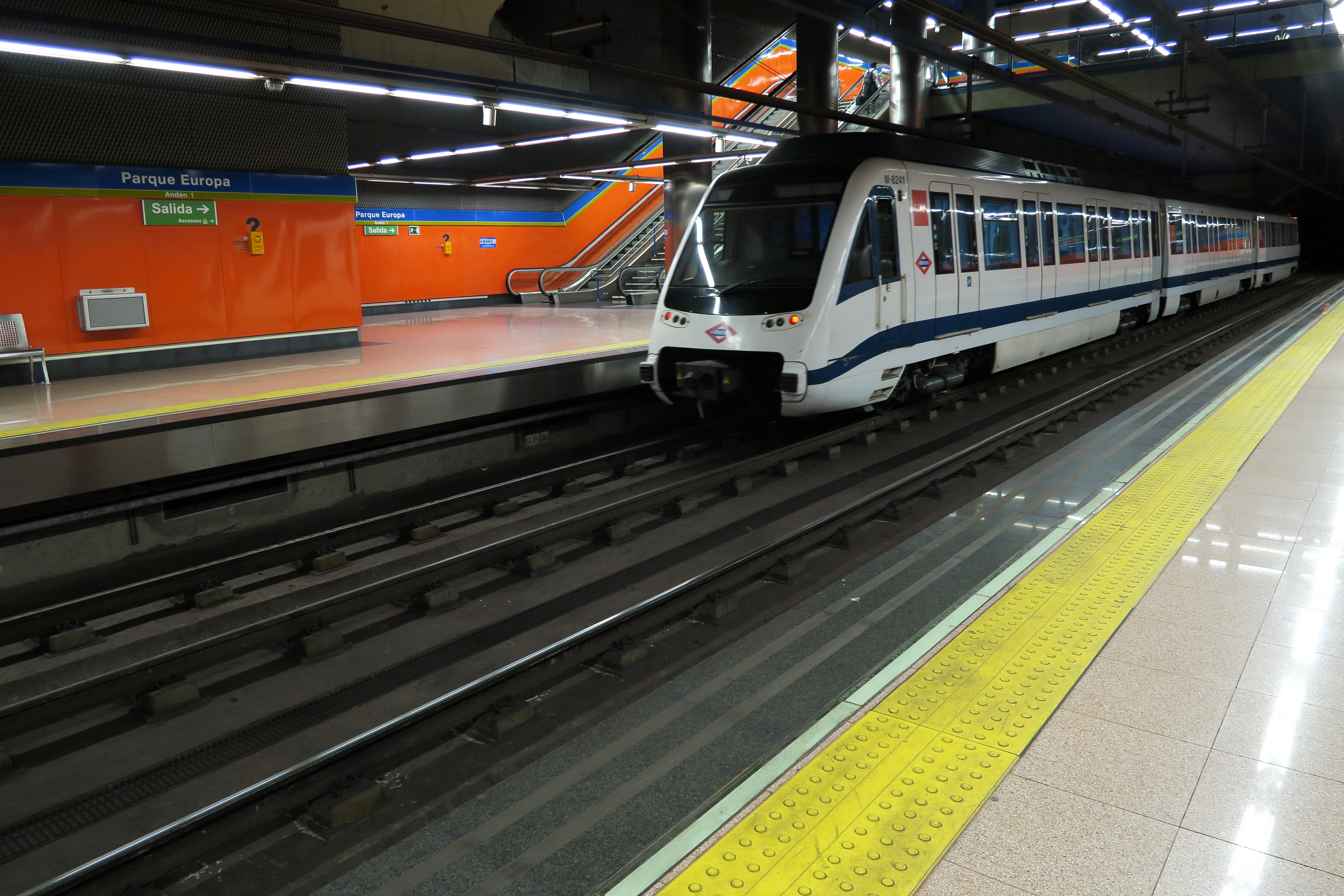
- Platforms of the station

General information
- Location: Fuenlabrada, Community of Madrid; Spain
- Coordinates: 40.2851754°N 3.8063216°W
- System: Madrid Metro station
- Owner: CRTM
- Operator: CRTM

Construction
- Accessible: yes

Other information
- Fare zone: B2

History
- Opened: 11 April 2003; 23 years ago

Services
Preceding station	Madrid Metro	Following station
Hospital de Fuenlabrada clockwise / outer	Line 12	Fuenlabrada Central anticlockwise / inner
Location
- Location within Community of Madrid

Parque Europa [ˈpaɾke ewˈɾopa] is a station on Line 12 of the Madrid Metro, named for the nearby Parque Europa (Europe Park). It is located in fare Zone B2.
