= Arroyo Culebro (Madrid Metro) =

Madrid Metro station

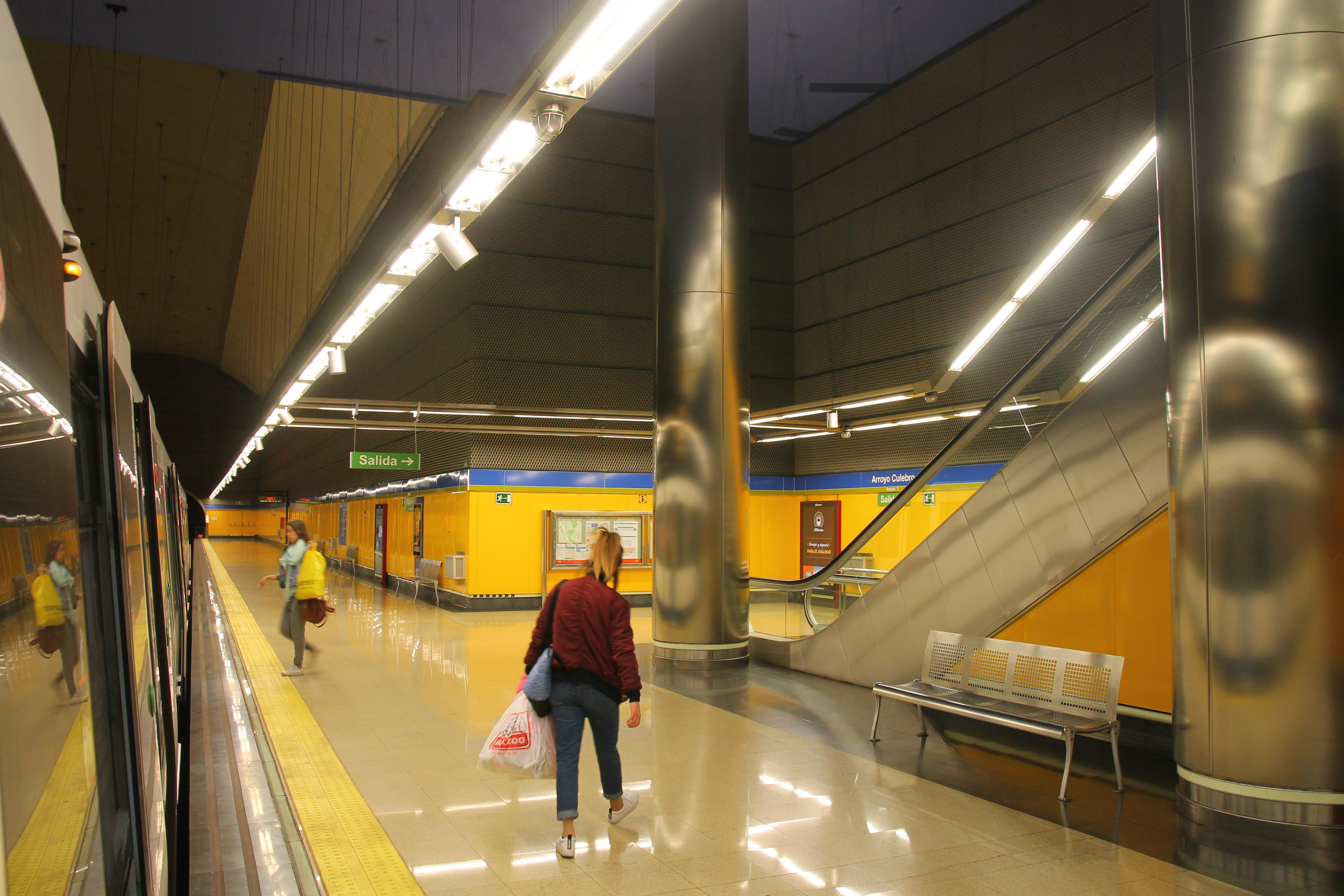
- Platform of the station

General information
- Location: Getafe, Community of Madrid; Spain
- Coordinates: 40.2887434°N 3.7568226°W
- System: Madrid Metro station
- Owner: CRTM
- Operator: CRTM

Construction
- Accessible: yes

Other information
- Fare zone: B1

History
- Opened: 11 April 2003; 23 years ago

Services
Preceding station	Madrid Metro	Following station
Parque de los Estados clockwise / outer	Line 12	Conservatorio anticlockwise / inner
Location
- Location within Community of Madrid

Arroyo Culebro [aˈroʝo kuˈleβɾo] is a station on Line 12 of the Madrid Metro, serving the Arroyo Culebro ("Snake Stream") barrio of Getafe. It is located in fare Zone B1.
