= Juan de la Cierva (Madrid Metro) =

Madrid Metro station

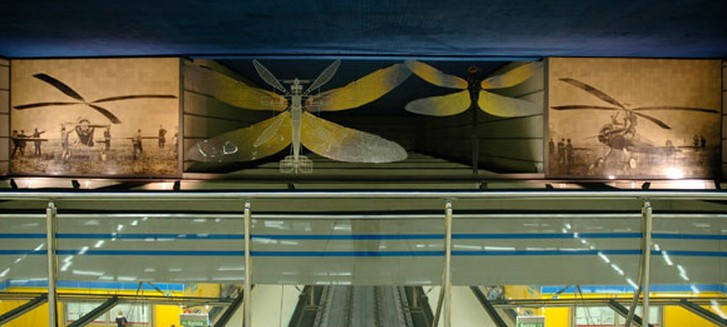
- Mural in the station with image of de la Cierva's autogyro

General information
- Location: Getafe, Madrid; Spain
- Coordinates: 40.311803°N 3.7222451°W
- System: Madrid Metro station
- Owner: CRTM
- Operator: CRTM

Construction
- Accessible: yes

Other information
- Fare zone: B1

History
- Opened: 11 April 2003; 23 years ago

Services
Preceding station	Madrid Metro	Following station
Getafe Central clockwise / outer	Line 12	El Casar anticlockwise / inner
Location
- Location within Madrid

Juan de la Cierva [ˈxwan de la ˈθjeɾβa] is a station on Line 12 of the Madrid Metro, named for the Avenida Juan de la Cierva, which is named in turn for the aviator Juan de la Cierva (1895–1936). It is located in fare Zone B1.
