= Móstoles Central (Madrid Metro) =

Madrid Metro station

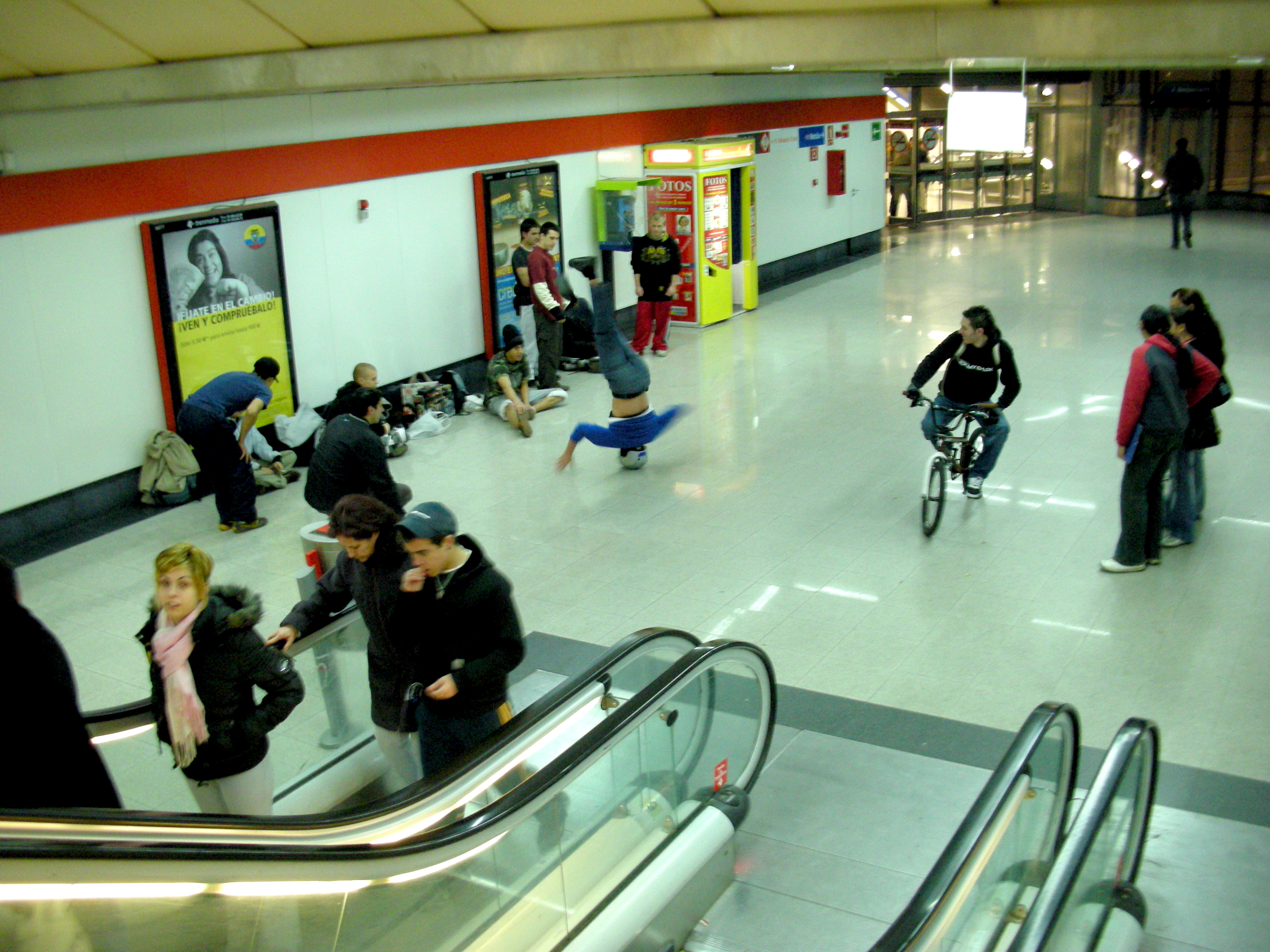

General information
- Location: Móstoles, Community of Madrid; Spain
- Coordinates: 40.3287197°N 3.8633785°W
- System: Madrid Metro station
- Owner: CRTM
- Operator: CRTM

Construction
- Accessible: yes

Other information
- Fare zone: B2

History
- Opened: 11 April 2003; 23 years ago

Services
Preceding station	Madrid Metro	Following station
Universidad Rey Juan Carlos clockwise / outer	Line 12	Pradillo anticlockwise / inner
Out of system interchange
Preceding station	Cercanías Madrid	Following station
Móstoles-El Soto Terminus	C-5	Las Retamas towards Humanes
Location
- Location within Community of Madrid

Móstoles Central ([ˈmostoles θenˈtɾal], "Central Móstoles") is a station on Line 12 of the Madrid Metro. It is located in fare Zone B2. The station offers connection to Cercanías Madrid via Móstoles railway station.
