= Manuela Malasaña (Madrid Metro) =

Madrid Metro station

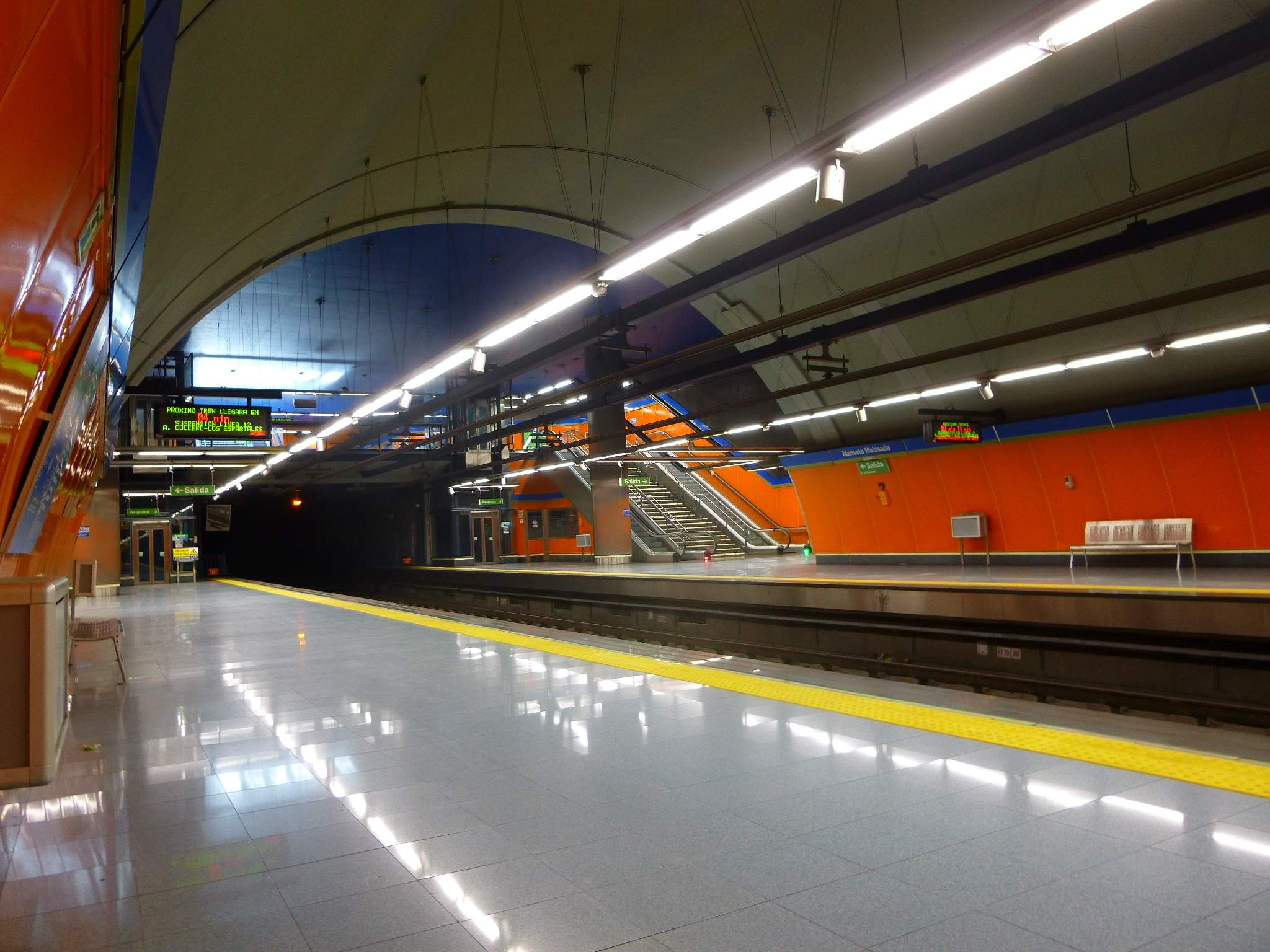

General information
- Location: Móstoles, Madrid; Spain
- Coordinates: 40.3090301°N 3.8640212°W
- System: Madrid Metro station
- Owner: CRTM
- Operator: CRTM

Construction
- Accessible: yes

Other information
- Fare zone: B2

History
- Opened: 11 April 2003; 23 years ago

Services
Preceding station	Madrid Metro	Following station
Hospital de Móstoles clockwise / outer	Line 12	Loranca anticlockwise / inner
Location
- Location within Community of Madrid

Manuela Malasaña [maˈnwe.la ma.laˈsa.ɲa] is a station on Line 12 of the Madrid Metro, named for the nearby school IES Manuela Malasaña, which is named for the Spanish heroine Manuela Malasaña (1791–1808). It is located in fare Zone B2.
