= El Carrascal (Madrid Metro) =

Madrid Metro station

- Platform of the station

General information
- Location: Leganés, Community of Madrid; Spain
- Coordinates: 40°20′12″N 03°44′25″W
- System: Madrid Metro station
- Owner: CRTM
- Operator: CRTM

Construction
- Accessible: yes

Other information
- Fare zone: B1

History
- Opened: 11 April 2003; 23 years ago

Services
Preceding station	Madrid Metro	Following station
El Bercial clockwise / outer	Line 12	Julián Besteiro anticlockwise / inner
Location
- Location within Madrid

El Carrascal [el ka.rasˈkal] is a station on Line 12 of the Madrid Metro, serving the El Carrascal ("The Oak Forest") neighborhood of Leganés. It is located in fare Zone B1. Is a below grade metro or light-rail station and underground structure. The project is located in Leganés, Madrid.
