= Hospital Severo Ochoa (Madrid Metro) =

Madrid Metro station

- Platform of the station

General information
- Location: Leganés, Madrid; Spain
- Coordinates: 40.3217703°N 3.767973°W
- System: Madrid Metro station
- Owner: CRTM
- Operator: CRTM

Construction
- Accessible: yes

Other information
- Fare zone: B1

History
- Opened: 11 April 2003; 23 years ago

Services
Preceding station	Madrid Metro	Following station
Casa del Reloj clockwise / outer	Line 12	Leganés Central anticlockwise / inner
Location
- Location within Madrid

Hospital Severo Ochoa [ospiˈtal seˈβeɾo oˈtʃoa] is a station on Line 12 of the Madrid Metro, serving the Severo Ochoa Hospital in Leganés, named for the scientist Severo Ochoa (1905–1993). It is located in fare Zone B1.
