= El Bercial (Madrid Metro) =

Madrid Metro station

- Platform of the station

General information
- Location: Getafe, Community of Madrid; Spain
- Coordinates: 40°19′46″N 03°43′48″W
- System: Madrid Metro station
- Owner: CRTM
- Operator: CRTM

Construction
- Accessible: yes

Other information
- Fare zone: B1

History
- Opened: 11 April 2003; 23 years ago

Services
Preceding station	Madrid Metro	Following station
Los Espartales clockwise / outer	Line 12	El Carrascal anticlockwise / inner
Location
- Location within Madrid

El Bercial [el βeɾˈθjal] is a station on Line 12 of the Madrid Metro, named for the El Bercial ("Place of Matweed") barrio of Getafe. It is located in fare Zone B1.
