= Parque Oeste (Madrid Metro) =

Madrid Metro station

- Platform of the station

General information
- Location: Alcorcón, Community of Madrid; Spain
- Coordinates: 40.3458961°N 3.849337°W
- System: Madrid Metro station
- Owner: CRTM
- Operator: CRTM

Construction
- Accessible: yes

Other information
- Fare zone: B1

History
- Opened: 11 April 2003; 23 years ago

Services
Preceding station	Madrid Metro	Following station
Alcorcón Central clockwise / outer	Line 12	Universidad Rey Juan Carlos anticlockwise / inner
Location
- Location within Community of Madrid

Parque Oeste ([ˈpaɾke oˈeste], "West Park") is a station on Line 12 of the Madrid Metro, located west of the King Juan Carlos University's Alcorcón Campus. It is located in fare Zone B1.
