= Casa del Reloj (Madrid Metro) =

Madrid Metro station

- Platform of the station

General information
- Location: Leganés, Community of Madrid; Spain
- Coordinates: 40.3266015°N 3.759423°W
- System: Madrid Metro station
- Owner: CRTM
- Operator: CRTM

Construction
- Accessible: yes

Other information
- Fare zone: B1

History
- Opened: 11 April 2003; 23 years ago

Services
Preceding station	Madrid Metro	Following station
Julián Besteiro clockwise / outer	Line 12	Hospital Severo Ochoa anticlockwise / inner
Location
- Location within Madrid

Casa del Reloj [ˈkasa ðel reˈlox] is a station on Line 12 of the Madrid Metro, next to the Casa del Reloj ("Clock House") housing development in Leganés. It is located in fare Zone B1.
