= Hospital de Móstoles (Madrid Metro) =

Madrid Metro station

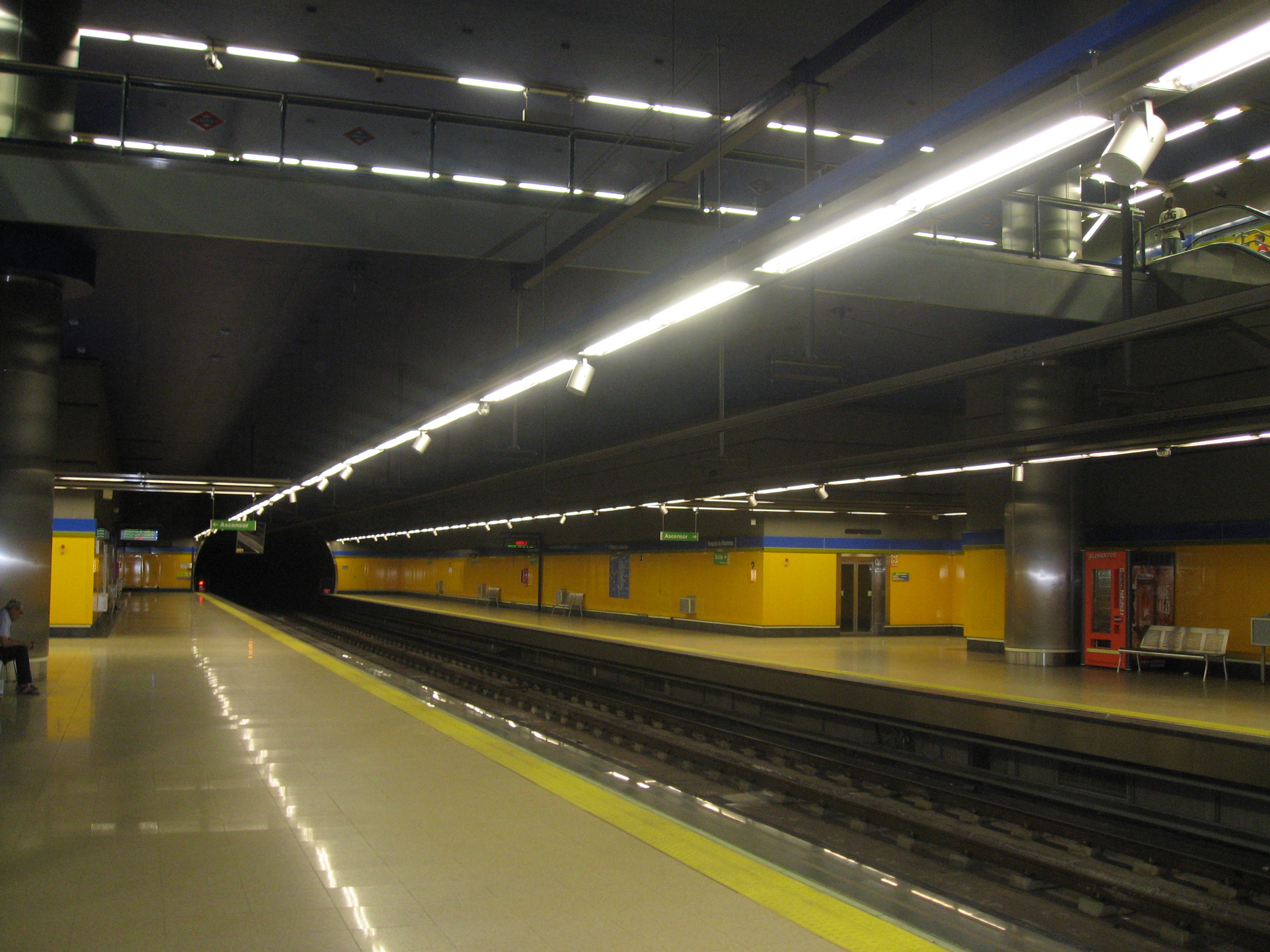

General information
- Location: Móstoles, Community of Madrid; Spain
- Coordinates: 40.3165265°N 3.874709°W
- System: Madrid Metro station
- Owner: CRTM
- Operator: CRTM

Construction
- Accessible: yes

Other information
- Fare zone: B2

History
- Opened: 11 April 2003; 23 years ago

Services
Preceding station	Madrid Metro	Following station
Pradillo clockwise / outer	Line 12	Manuela Malasaña anticlockwise / inner
Location
- Location within Community of Madrid

Hospital de Móstoles ([ospiˈtal de ˈmostoles], "Móstoles Hospital") is a station on Line 12 of the Madrid Metro. It is located in fare Zone B2.
