= Fuenlabrada Central (Madrid Metro) =

Madrid Metro station

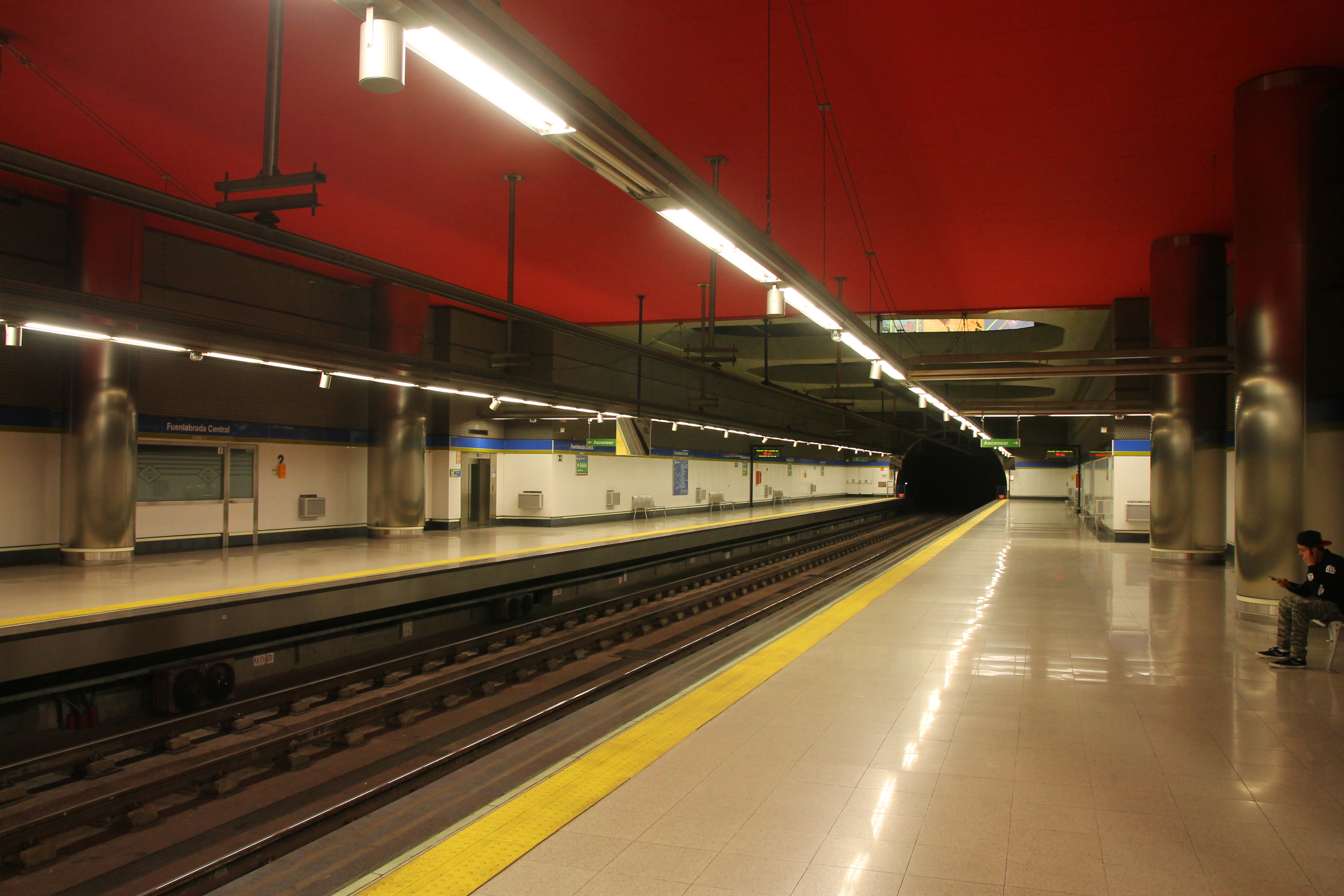
- Platforms of the station

General information
- Location: Fuenlabrada, Community of Madrid; Spain
- Coordinates: 40.2826772°N 3.7989045°W
- System: Madrid Metro station
- Owner: CRTM
- Operator: CRTM

Construction
- Accessible: yes

Other information
- Fare zone: B2

History
- Opened: 11 April 2003; 23 years ago

Services
Preceding station	Madrid Metro	Following station
Parque Europa clockwise / outer	Line 12	Parque de los Estados anticlockwise / inner
Out of system interchange
Preceding station	Cercanías Madrid	Following station
Humanes towards Móstoles-El Soto	C-5	La Serna towards Humanes
Location
- Location within Community of Madrid

Fuenlabrada Central ([fwenlaˈβɾaða θenˈtɾal], "Central Fuenlabrada") is a station in Madrid. It is on Line 12 of the Madrid Metro. It is located in fare Zone B1. The station offers connection to Cercanías Madrid via Fuenlabrada railway station.
