= Los Espartales (Madrid Metro) =

Madrid Metro station

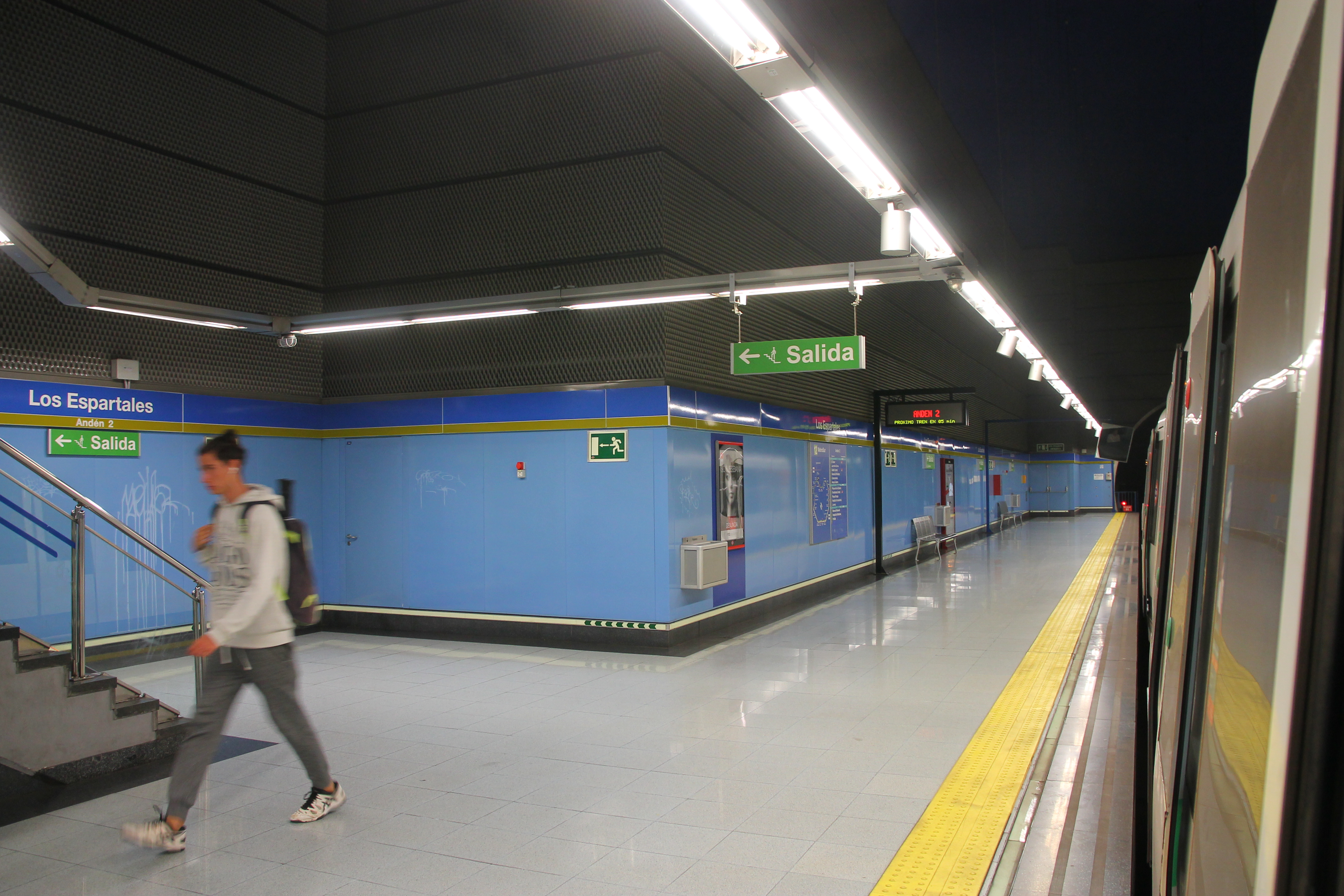
- Platform of the station

General information
- Location: Getafe, Madrid; Spain
- Coordinates: 40.3243°N 3.7183°W
- System: Madrid Metro station
- Owner: CRTM
- Operator: CRTM

Construction
- Accessible: yes

Other information
- Fare zone: B1

History
- Opened: 11 April 2003; 23 years ago

Services
Preceding station	Madrid Metro	Following station
El Casar clockwise / outer	Line 12	El Bercial anticlockwise / inner
Location
- Location within Madrid

Los Espartales [los espaɾˈtales] is a station on Line 12 of the Madrid Metro, named for the Los Espartales ("The Esparto Fields") housing development. It is located in fare Zone B1.
