= Celle station =

Railway station in Celle, Germany

Celle
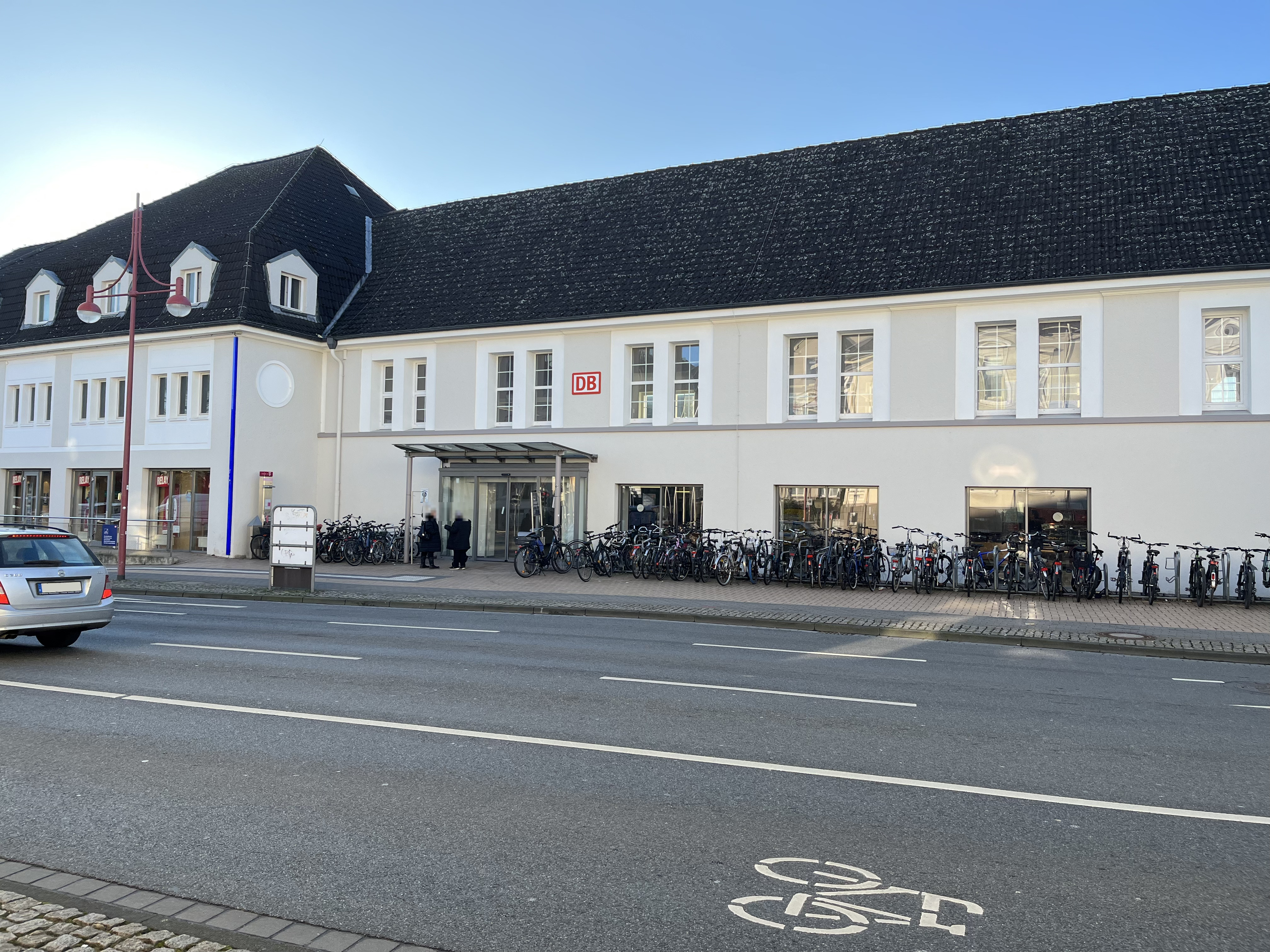
- 2023

General information
- Location: Bahnhofsplatz 6; 29221 Celle; Lower Saxony; Germany
- Coordinates: 52.6209°N 10.0633°E
- Elevation: 41 m (135 ft)
- Owner: Deutsche Bahn
- Operator: DB Station&Service
- Lines: Hanover–Hamburg railway (KBS 110); Lehrte–Celle railway (KBS 360.6.7); Celle–Soltau railway; Celle–Wittingen railway; Celle–Brunswick railway; Aller Valley Railway
- Platforms: 3 island platforms 1 side platform
- Tracks: 8
- Train operators: metronom

Construction
- Parking: yes
- Cycle facilities: yes
- Accessible: yes

Other information
- Station code: 1036
- DS100 code: HC
- IBNR: 8000064
- Category: 3
- Fare zone: CeBus: Celle (buses only); GVH: E (CeBus transitional tariff, monthly passes only)
- Website: www.bahnhof.de

Services
Preceding station	DB Fernverkehr	Following station
Uelzen towards Hamburg Hbf or Kiel Hbf	ICE 22	Hannover Hbf towards Stuttgart Hbf
Preceding station	Metronom	Following station
Großburgwedel towards Göttingen	RE 2	Eschede towards Uelzen
Großburgwedel towards Hannover Hbf	RE 3	Eschede towards Hamburg Hbf
Preceding station	Hanover S-Bahn	Following station
Ehlershausen towards Hannover Hbf	S 6	Terminus
Ehlershausen towards Hannover Hbf	S 7	Terminus
Location
- Location within Lower Saxony Location within Germany Location within Europe

Celle station is a railway station in the municipality of Celle, located in the Celle district in Lower Saxony, Germany.

The station is served hourly by Intercity/ICE trains to Hanover and Hamburg. In regional traffic, trains of the Metronom Eisenbahngesellschaft connect Celle with Hamburg and Uelzen as well as Hanover and Göttingen. Celle is the terminus of the S6 and S7 lines of the Hannover S-Bahn.

== History ==
On October 15, 1845, Celle received its first railway connection, which started in Lehrte and could be reached via Hanover and Braunschweig. On May 1, 1847, the extension to Harburg was opened. The first station building was designed by Conrad Wilhelm Hase.

In 1905, the railway line from Celle to Wahnebergen was completed, and in 1913, the railway line from Gifhorn Stadt to Celle was opened.

On September 1, 1920, the railway line from Celle to Brunswick was operational up to Uetze, and in 1923, the entire line to Braunschweig was open. A new station building was built between 1916 and 1919.

On May 15, 1938, the railway line to Langenhagen, which had already been started in 1913, was opened, and a large part of long-distance traffic to Hanover has since run on it.

In 1966, passenger traffic to Verden was discontinued, and freight traffic gradually reduced until 2005, when the airport in Wietzenbruch was still accessible by rail. Passenger traffic towards Braunschweig ended in 1971, and the last section to Nienhagen was discontinued for freight traffic in 1990. In 1981, passenger traffic to Gifhorn ended, and freight traffic was still possible until 1993 to Müden-Dieckhorst.

In 2019, elevators were installed on the platforms, and from 2012 to 2015, the station building and platforms were renovated, with new roofs added to the platforms. The station was transformed into a "light art station".

In December 2020, the DB travel centre at the station was closed, and a service centre for the metronom railway company was opened to take over ticket sales.

== Facilities ==
The train station has three partially covered central platforms with tracks 2 to 7, which are accessible barrier-free via a tunnel. Due to the platform height of 55 cm on platforms 4 and 5, barrier-free boarding is currently not possible. Track 5 (north) and track 6 (south) serve long-distance and regional trains and are also used for freight and long-distance passenger train crossings. Tracks 4 and 7 are mainly used as sidings. Tracks 4, 5, and 6 have the required length for ICE 1 and 4 trains. ICE-T and ICE-L trains can also operate on track 7. Track 2 is only connected on one side (to the south). There is a short platform at track 1, but it is only used for access to the south-facing parking garage. The platform at track 8 for the Allertalbahn has been dismantled. South of the passenger station is the freight station, where the railway depot was located south of Wiesenstraße. Today, a wagon repair facility is located there.

In the third expert draft of the Deutschlandtakt, it is planned to create parallel travel options for the S-Bahn towards Lehrte and the rail freight transport towards Hamburg. Investments of 4 million euros, at 2015 prices, are planned for this.

== Operation ==
The station is served by local and long-distance lines in passenger transport.

== Osthannoversche Eisenbahnen ==
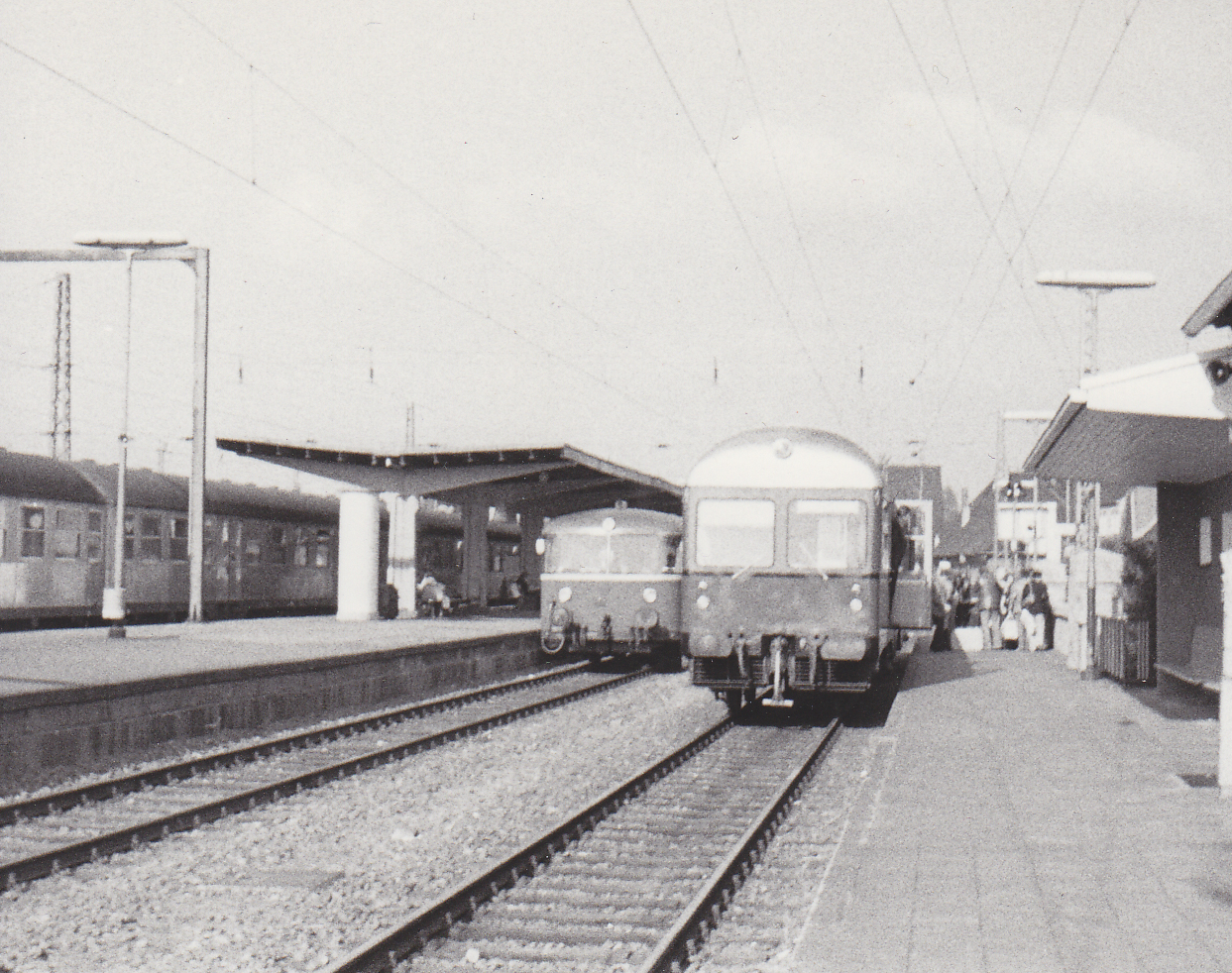
In 1975, a railcar from the Osthannoversche Eisenbahnen (OHE) is seen on track 1 of the station.

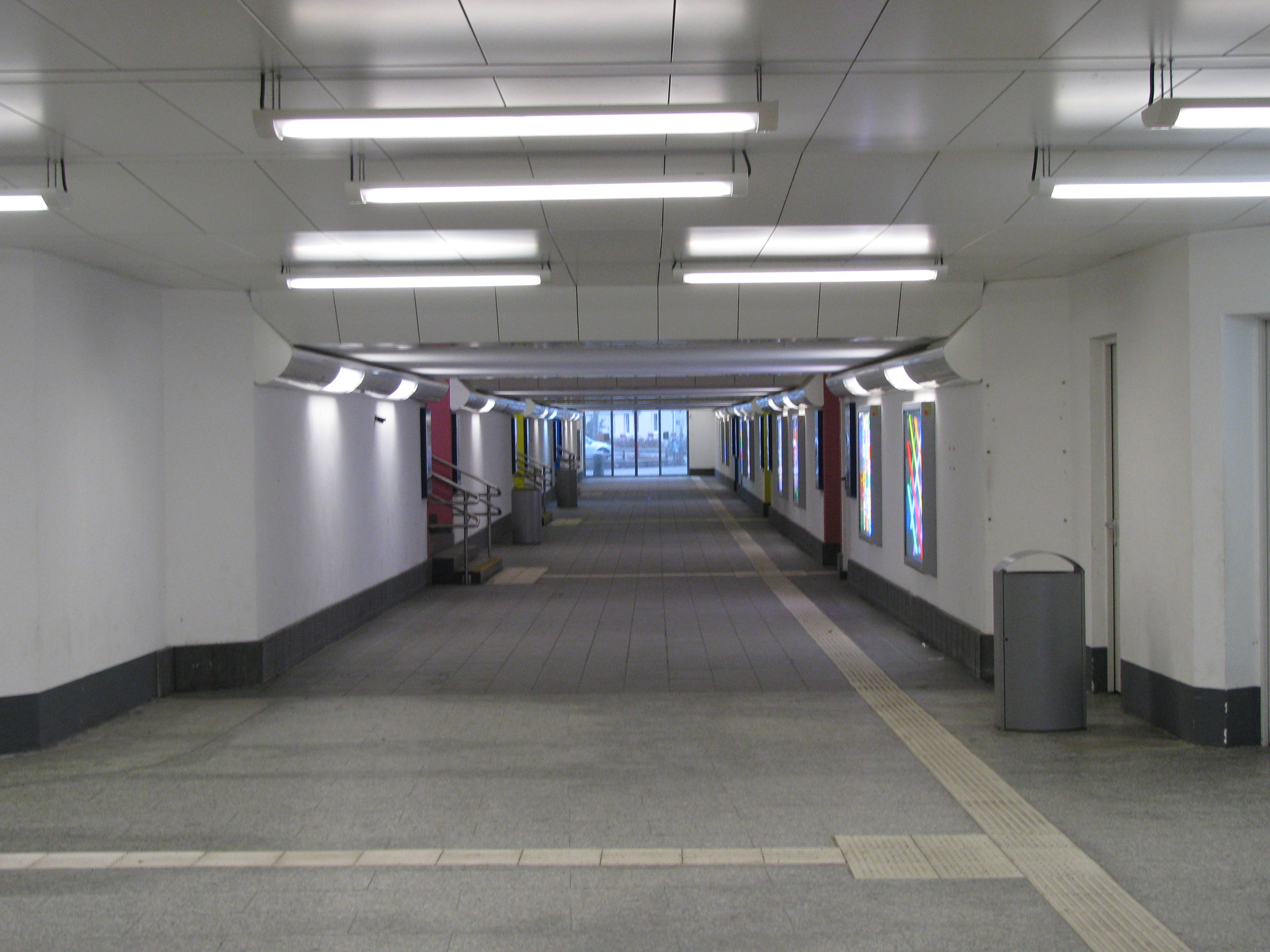
Access to the platforms towards the west exit.

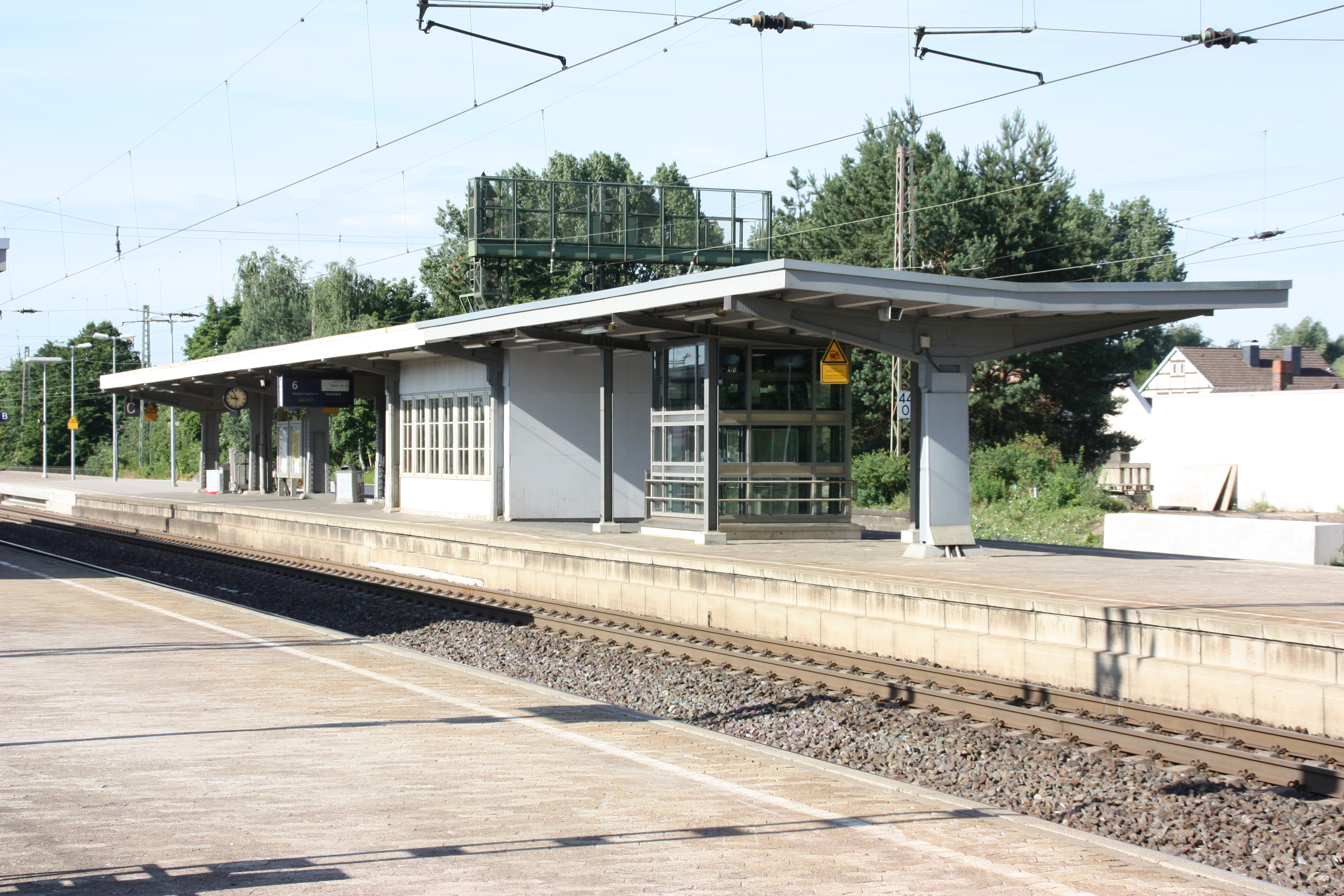
"Platform 6/7 seen from platform 4/5 before the transformation into the "Light Art Station""

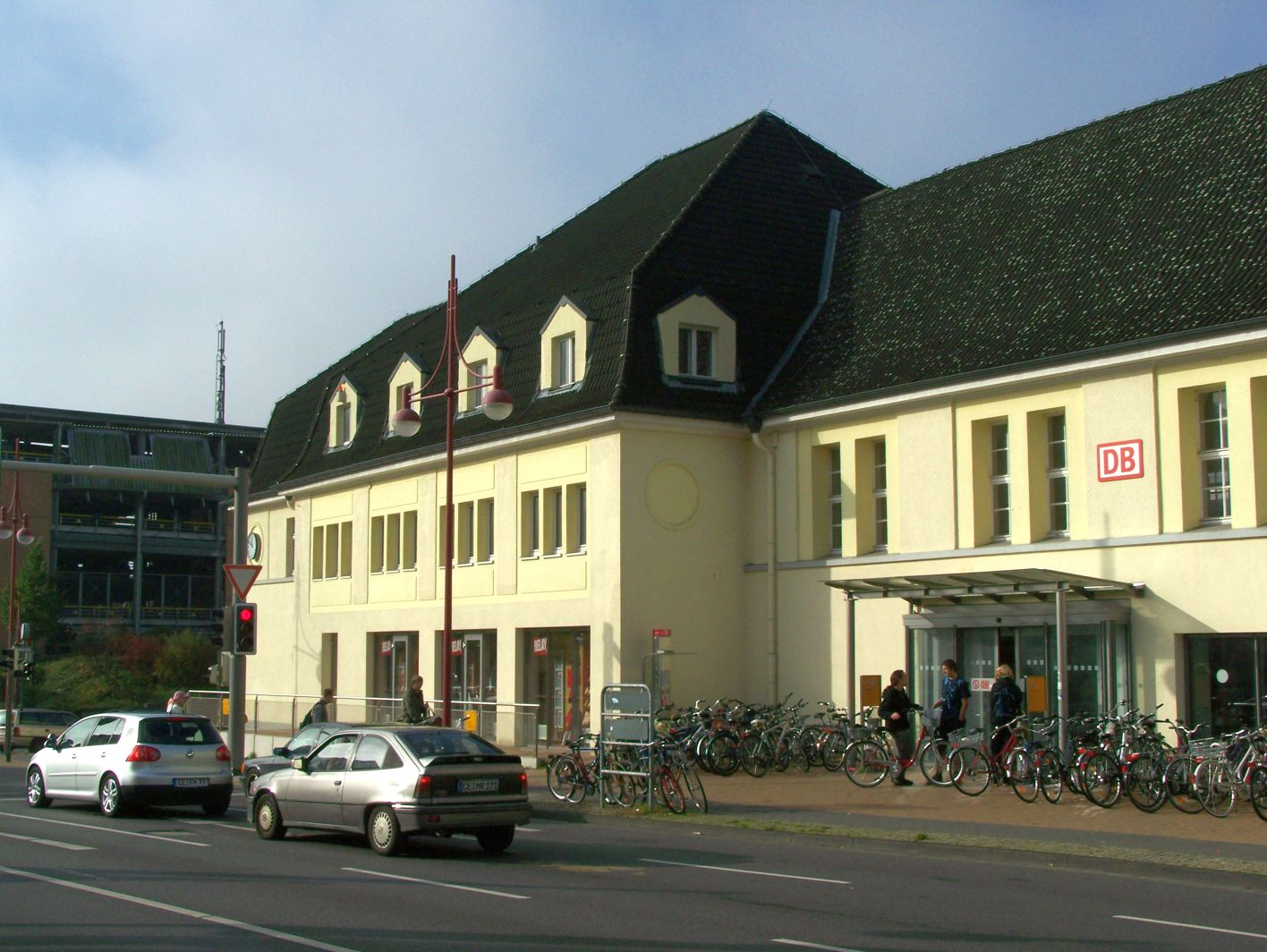
Train station street side 2008

North of the Aller River, which marks the northern boundary of the station, lies Celle Nord station of the OHE. It was opened in 1904 for the Celle-Wittingen narrow-gauge railway and later became the endpoint for the existing Celle-Soltau and Celle-Munster railways. From 1959, passenger trains were run to Celle station, but before that, passengers had to walk between the two stations using a pedestrian footbridge over the Aller. In 1976, OHE discontinued its passenger service from Celle. The Celle Nord station has a reception building which now houses the administration, three platform edges were present but were dismantled after trains were introduced to Celle station. There was a freight handling facility, workshops, and a roundhouse with 13 stalls.

== See also ==
- Rail transport in Germany
- Railway stations in Germany
