= C-5 (Cercanías Madrid) =

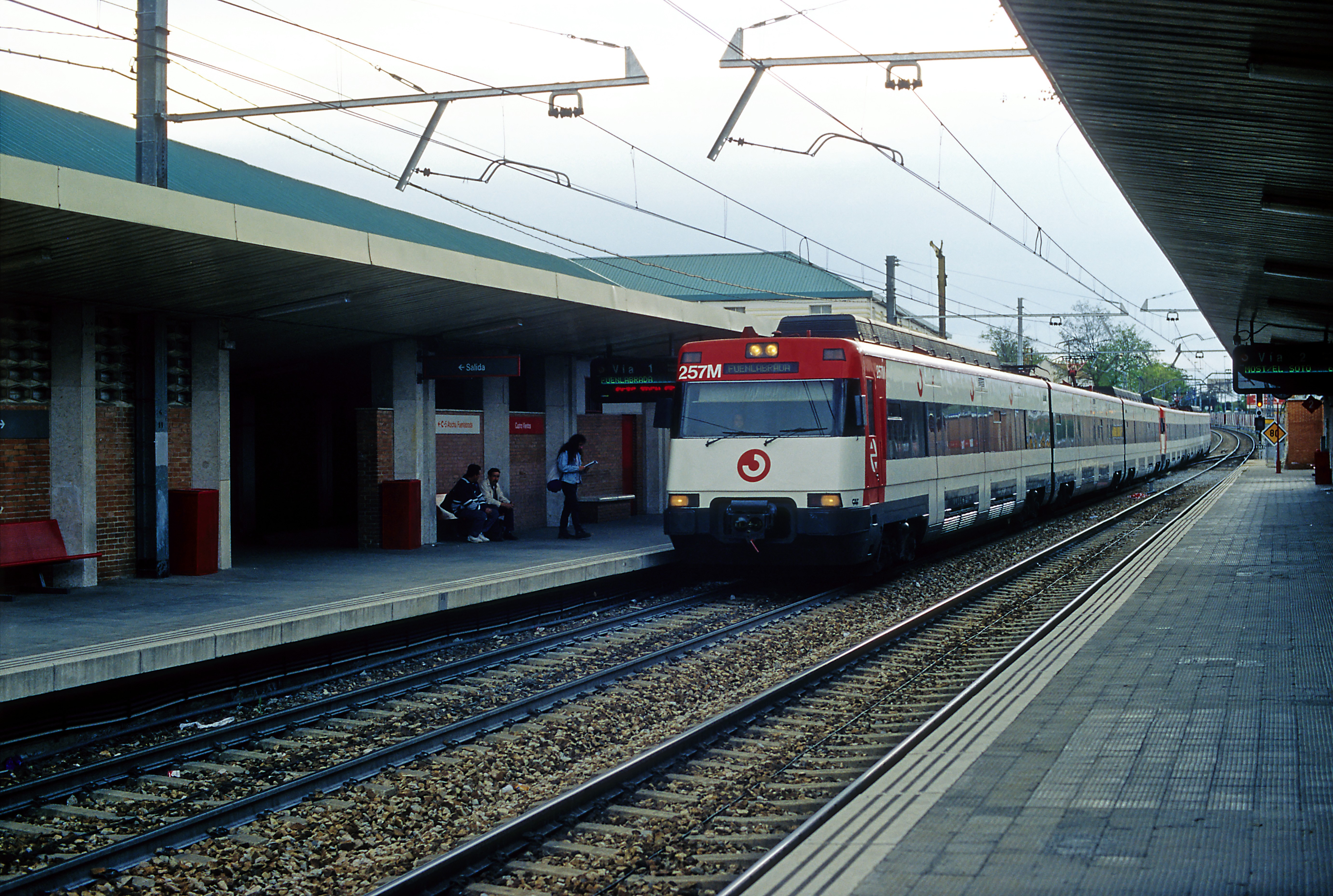
- A class 446 train on a C-5 service towards Fuenlabrada in Cuatro Vientos station in 2002.

Overview
- Status: Operational
- Owner: Adif
- Locale: Madrid, Community of Madrid, Spain
- Termini: Móstoles-El Soto; Humanes
- Stations: 23

Service
- Type: Commuter rail/rapid transit
- System: Cercanías Madrid
- Services: Móstoles-Parla railway Madrid–Valencia de Alcántara railway
- Operator: Renfe Operadora
- Rolling stock: Civia and 446 Series EMUs

History
- Opened: 1981; 45 years ago

Technical
- Line length: 45.1 km (28.0 mi)
- Number of tracks: Double
- Track gauge: 1,668 mm (5 ft 5 21/32 in) Iberian gauge
- Electrification: 3kV AC overhead line

The C-5 is a 45.1-kilometre (28.0 mi) commuter rail service in the Community of Madrid. It is part of the Cercanías Madrid network, operated by Renfe Operadora. Line C-5 runs from Móstoles El Soto to Humanes, passing through the cities of Móstoles, Alcorcón, Madrid, Leganés and Fuenlabrada.

Unlike the rest of the Cercanías network, line C-5 more closely resembles the lines of the Madrid Metro rather than a commuter line. The service operates 4-minute headways during the morning rush hours, and 6-8 minute headways during the afternoons. On weekends and holidays, the line operates on a 10-minute frequency. Stations on line C-5 are also much closer to each other than the rest of the Cercanías lines.

Line C-5 is the only Cercanías commuter line to employ the LZB signaling system.

== History ==
Line C-5 first opened in 1980. Line C-6 was merged to this line in 1991.

== List of stations ==
The following table lists the name of each station served by line C-5 in order from west to south, connections to other Cercanías lines and other networks, the municipality in which each station is located, as well as the fare zone each station belongs to according to the Madrid Metro fare zone system.

Municipality	Station	Connections	Zone
Móstoles	Móstoles-El Soto		
Móstoles	Móstoles	Madrid Metro: (at Móstoles Central)	
Alcorcón	Las Retamas		
Alcorcón	Alcorcón	Madrid Metro: (at Alcorcón Central)	
Alcorcón	San José de Valderas		
Madrid	Cuatro Vientos	Madrid Metro:	
Madrid	Las Águilas		
Madrid	Maestra Justa Freire-Polideportivo Aluche		
Madrid	Aluche	Madrid Metro:	
Madrid	Laguna	Madrid Metro:	
Madrid	Embajadores	Madrid Metro:	
Madrid	Atocha	Renfe Operadora: AVE, Alvia, Alaris, Altaria, Talgo; Cercanías Madrid: Madrid Metro:	
Madrid	Méndez Álvaro	Cercanías Madrid: Madrid Metro:	
Madrid	Doce de Octubre		
Madrid	Orcasitas		
Madrid	Puente Alcocer		
Madrid	Villaverde Alto	Cercanías Madrid: Madrid Metro:	
Leganés	Zarzaquemada		
Leganés	Leganés	Madrid Metro: (at Leganés Central)	
Leganés	Parque Polvoranca		
Fuenlabrada	La Serna		
Fuenlabrada	Fuenlabrada	Madrid Metro: (at Fuenlabrada Central)	
Humanes de Madrid	Humanes		
