= Leganés Central (Madrid Metro) =

Madrid Metro station

- Platforms of the station

General information
- Location: Leganés, Community of Madrid; Spain
- Coordinates: 40.3289809°N 3.771539°W
- System: Madrid Metro station
- Owner: CRTM
- Operator: CRTM

Construction
- Accessible: yes

Other information
- Fare zone: B1

History
- Opened: 11 April 2003; 23 years ago

Services
Preceding station	Madrid Metro	Following station
Hospital Severo Ochoa clockwise / outer	Line 12	San Nicasio anticlockwise / inner
Out of system interchange
Preceding station	Cercanías Madrid	Following station
Parque Polvoranca towards Móstoles-El Soto	C-5	Zarzaquemada towards Humanes
Location
- Location within Madrid

Leganés Central ([leɣaˈnes θenˈtɾal], "Central Leganés") is a station on Line 12 of the Madrid Metro. It is located in fare Zone B1. The station offers connection to Cercanías Madrid via Leganés railway station.
