= Class 446 =

Class 446 may refer to:

- British Rail Class 446, prototype electric multiple units
- Renfe Class 446, electric multiple units
