= Hanover–Hamburg railway =

Railway line in Germany

Hannover–Hamburg railway

Overview
- Line number: 1710 (Hannover–Celle); 1720 (Celle–Harburg); 2200 (Harburg–Hamburg); 1153 (freight: Lüneburg–Stelle); 1280/1/4 (freight:Ashausen–Hamburg)
- Locale: Lower Saxony and Hamburg, Germany

Service
- Route number: 110

Technical
- Number of tracks: 2
- Track gauge: 1,435 mm (4 ft 8 1/2 in) standard gauge
- Electrification: 15 kV/16.7 Hz AC overhead catenary
- Operating speed: 200 km/h (124.3 mph) 70 (maximum)

The Hanover–Hamburg railway is one of the most important railway lines in Lower Saxony and Germany. It links the Lower Saxon state capital of Hanover with Hamburg, running through Celle, Uelzen and Lüneburg.

== History ==
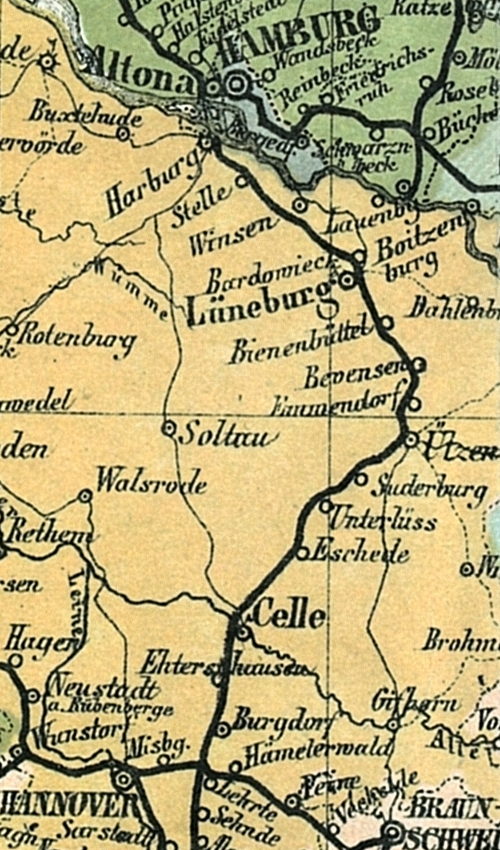
Lehrte-Harburg line (1861)

The main section of the route, the line from Celle to Harburg, was opened on 1 May 1847 by the Royal Hanoverian State Railways. It formed a junction with the so-called Kreuzbahn from Lehrte, then the most important railway hub in the Hanover region, to Celle. The Hanover–Lehrte–Celle railway had been opened as early as 15 October 1845. The Celle–Harburg section opened up the northeastern part of the Kingdom of Hanover. At that time Harburg was still Hanover's rival to the port of Hamburg; there was still no link across the Elbe.

In 1864 the line finally reached Hamburg with a detour over the Lauenburg–Hohnstorf ferry and the railway bridge over the Elbe from Harburg to Hamburg was rapidly completely following the unification of Germany into the German Empire in 1872. By 1906 the line was open to the Hanoverian station, known today as Hamburg Hauptbahnhof.

Junctions with other lines were formed including the America Line, the Aller Valley Railway from Gifhorn via Celle and Schwarmstedt to Verden (Aller), the Wendland Railway, the Braunschweig–Uelzen railway, several predecessors of the East Hanoverian Railways as well as the Celle–Brunswick, Lüneburg–Buchholz in der Nordheide, Lübeck–Lüneburg and Uelzen–Dannenberg railways.

The link from Langenhagen on the Heath Railway to Celle, also called the Hare Railway (Hasenbahn), which had been started in 1913, was not opened until 15 May 1938. This enabled direct trains to be run through from Hamburg to South Germany without having to detour via Lehrte and change direction in Hanover. That said, the route was not doubled until 2 November 1964, prior to that many passenger trains had to stop or pass through Lehrte. Since 6 April 1965 the line has been fully electrified. Goods trains do not go via Langenhagen as a rule, but through Lehrte and the Hanover freight bypass.

The 1973 Federal Transport Plan foresaw the upgraded Hamburg–Uelzen–Hanover line as one of eight planned projects for the railway system. The line was classified as an upgrade that was urgently needed in the 1985 Federal Transport Plan.

Around 1970 a large number of trial runs took place on the line, which were used to research the requirements for the routine running of trains at 200 km/h. In order to have a longer high-speed section, the line was relaid in places at the end of the 1970s near Unterlüß and Bienenbüttel. On 13 August 1980, locomotive number 120 002 set a new world speed record of 231 km/h for rotary current locomotives between Celle and Uelzen.

The first section to be upgraded for 200 km/h running was the 78.4 km (48.7 mi) long stretch of line between Langenhagen and Uelzen which was brought gradually into service from 1978 and 1984. In 1984 the section between Lüneburg and Bevensen (20.3 km (12.6 mi)) followed, and in 1987 the final 32.5 km (20.2 mi) stretch from Meckelfeld to Lüneburg. The 95 individual measures cost 185 million DM (at 1991 prices). These included numerous improvements to the line that often required considerable earthworks.

During the preparations for Expo 2000 two new S-Bahn tracks were built between Hanover Hauptbahnhof and Langenhagen (today - Pferdemarkt station). The halt at Hanover-Herrenhausen was closed and replaced by the S-Bahn halt of Hanover-Ledeburg. A new halt, Langenhagen-Mitte, was built for both the S-Bahn and long-distance lines.

From 2007 to 2009 the 1,700-metre (5,600 ft)-long elevated railway (Pfeilerbahn) in the port area south of Hamburg Hauptbahnhof was torn down and rebuilt. It had been moved in order to provide a new approach to the central station that would not be threatened by flooding or involved any track crossings.

=== Planned new line ===
In a study carried out in October 1962 the Group for General Studies proposed the construction of a high-speed railway line between Hamburg and Hanover. The new route, capable of handling trains at speeds of up to 200 km/h, was to be 27 km shorter than the existing line and would reduce journey times to 60 minutes.

=== Further upgrade ===
A further upgrade of the line is planned, whereby the section from Stelle (where the tracks merge into the marshalling yard at Maschen) to Lüneburg will be increased to three tracks. It is expected to be completed by 2012. In January 2009 Deutsche Bahn AG tendered for two sections of the triple track upgrade between Stelle and Lüneburg; this including a four-tracked section between Stelle and Ashausen. The estimated costs of the contract which will run from October 2009 to July 2012 are around 255 millionen euros (excluding tax).

If the 1985 Federal Transport Plan envisaged a triple track all the way to Celle, the current plans intend to relieve overloading on the existing line for the foreseeable future with the planned wye section (Y-Trasse).

=== Accidents ===
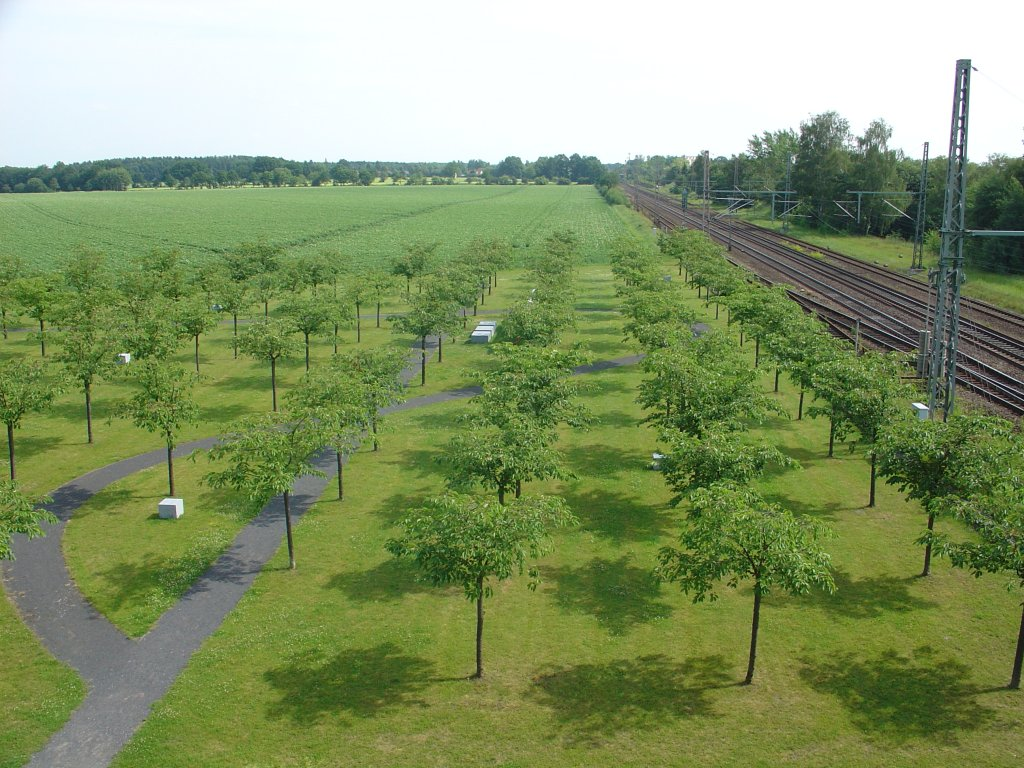
Memorial gardens in Eschede

- On 3 June 1998 the ICE Wilhelm Conrad Röntgen derailed in the immediate vicinity of the station at Eschede and rammed a bridge. In the Eschede train disaster 101 people were killed. The cause of the tragedy was a wheel tyre that had suffered from fatigue and fractured.
- On 17 November 2001 there was a near miss at Bienenbüttel. The engine driver of an ICE was supposed to overtake a stationary goods train by switching to the oncoming track. In doing so he passed a set of points designed for 80 km/h running at a speed of 185 km/h without derailing. The cause was thought to be a mistake in switching the speed of the train from 60 to 80 km/h. By failing to notice the speed limit the line computer signalled the train control system a permitted speed of 200 km/h applicable to straight running, instead of the branch-off speed of 80 km/h.

== Operation ==
The entire route of this electrified line, which has a minimum of two tracks, is worked by InterCity Express, InterCity, Metronom and RegionalBahn trains. The latter have recently been taken over by Metronom as Metronom-regional (MEr) trains and, in places, by S-Bahn commuter services. In addition there is heavy goods traffic on the line. Between Langenhagen-Pferdemarkt and Hanover S-Bahn trains run in addition to the Metronom services, Celle is connected to the S-Bahn network via Lehrte. Fares set by the GVH apply between Großburgwedel and Hanover; Celle district is linked to the GVH with special time-related fares. Between Lüneburg and Hamburg fares are set by the HVV.

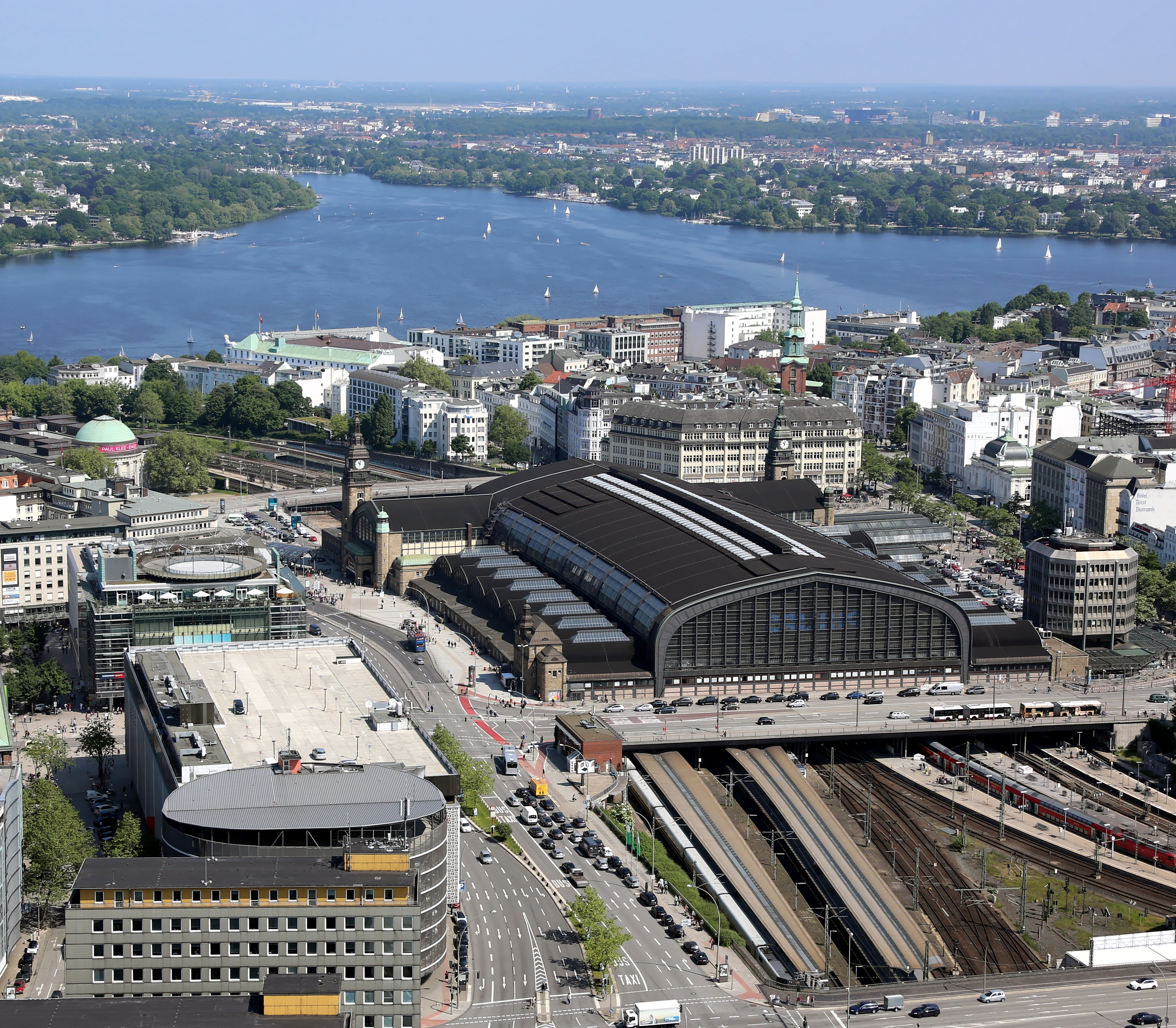
Hamburg Hauptbahnhof

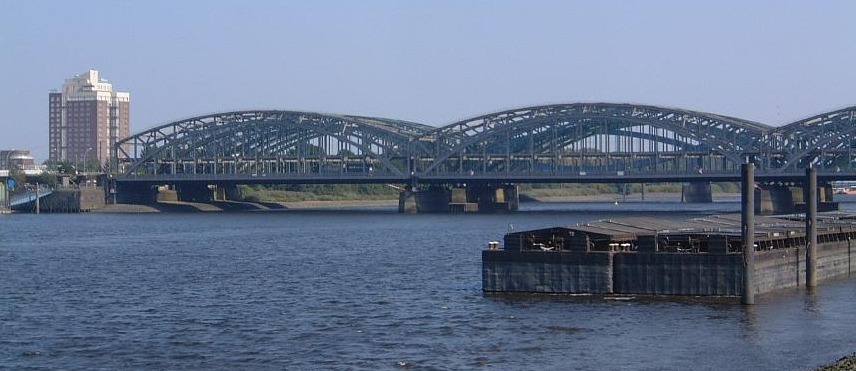
North Elbe Bridge

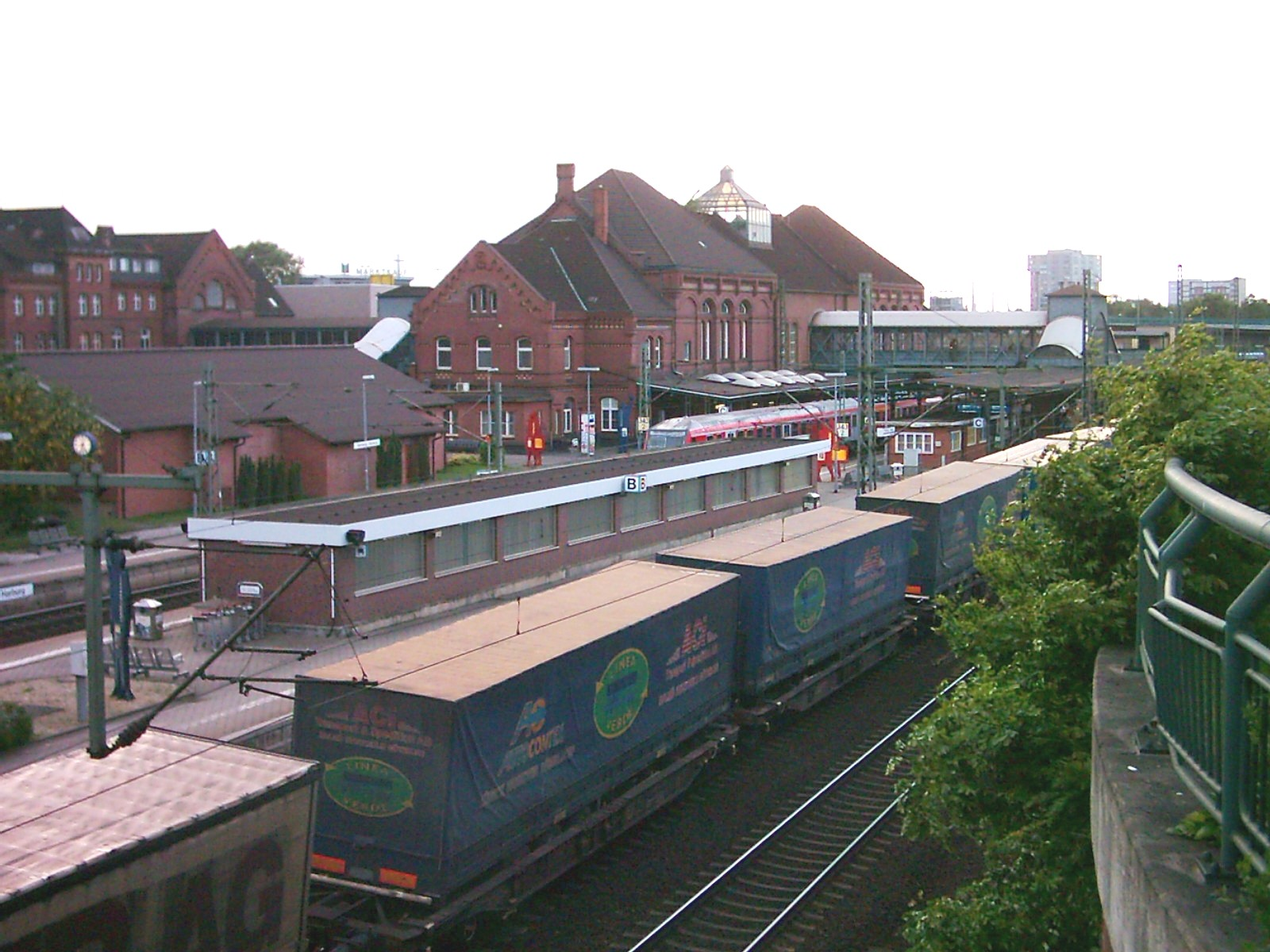
Hamburg-Harburg station

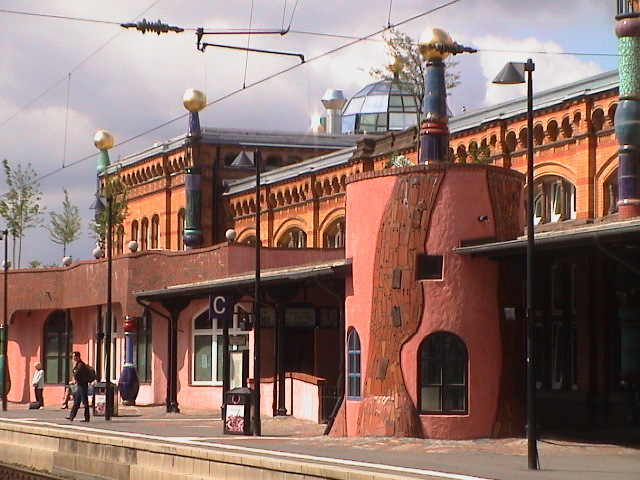
Uelzen station

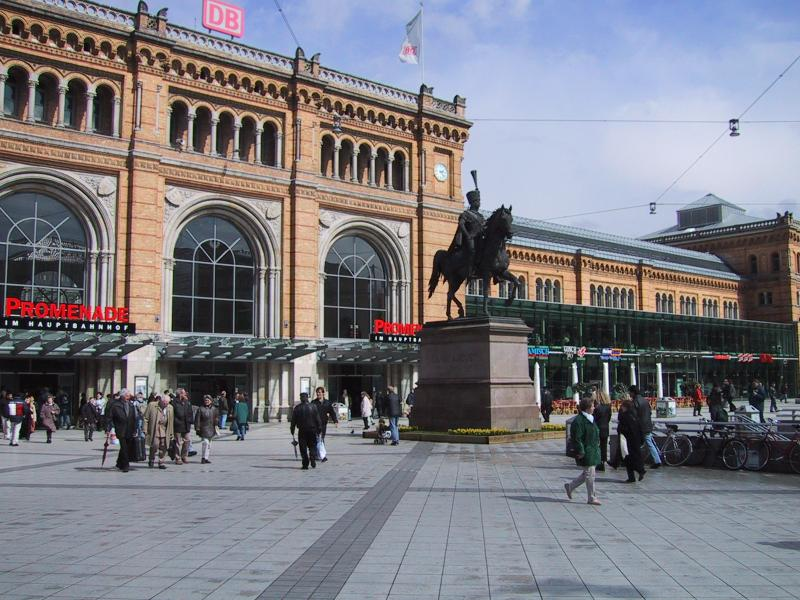
Hanover Hauptbahnhof
