= Linienzugbeeinflussung =

In-cab signalling and train protection system

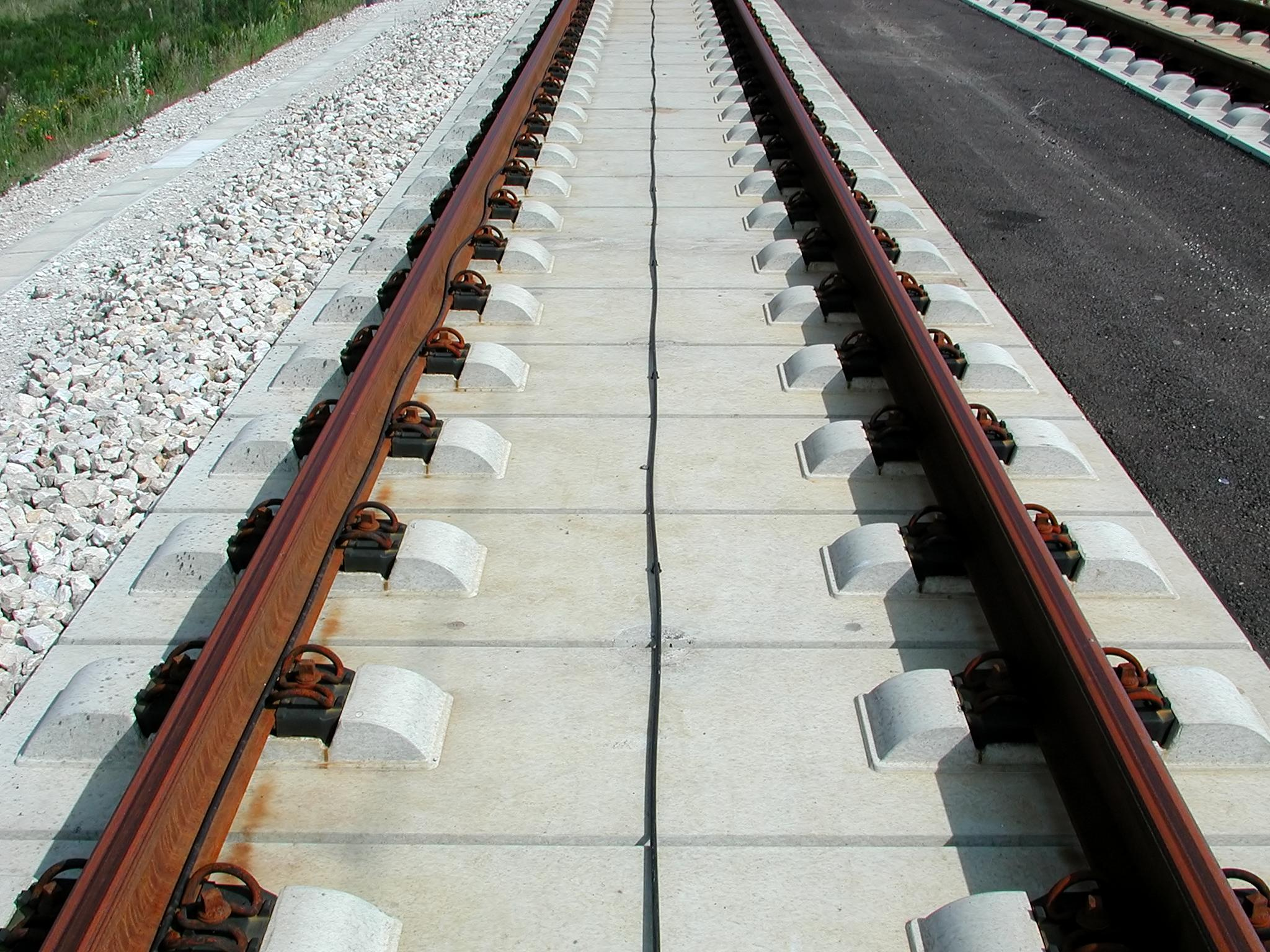
Track equipped with LZB loops. Notice the second cable on the lower part of the left rail.

Linienzugbeeinflussung (or LZB) is a cab signalling and train protection system used on selected German and Austrian railway lines as well as on the AVE and some commuter rail lines in Spain. The system was mandatory where trains were allowed to exceed speeds of 160 km/h (99 mph) in Germany and 220 km/h (140 mph) in Spain. It is also used on some slower railway and urban rapid transit lines to increase capacity. In German, the word Linienzugbeeinflussung translates to continuous train control, or more literally: linear train influencing. It is also occasionally called linienförmige Zugbeeinflussung.

LZB is deprecated, and is to be replaced with the European Train Control System (ETCS) between 2023 and 2030. It is referenced by European Union Agency for Railways (ERA) as a Class B train protection system in National Train Control (NTC). Driving cars mostly have to replace classical control logic to ETCS Onboard Units (OBU) with common Driver Machine Interface (DMI). Because high performance trains are often not scrapped or reused on second order lines, special Specific Transmission Modules (STM) for LZB were developed for further support of LZB installation.

== Overview ==
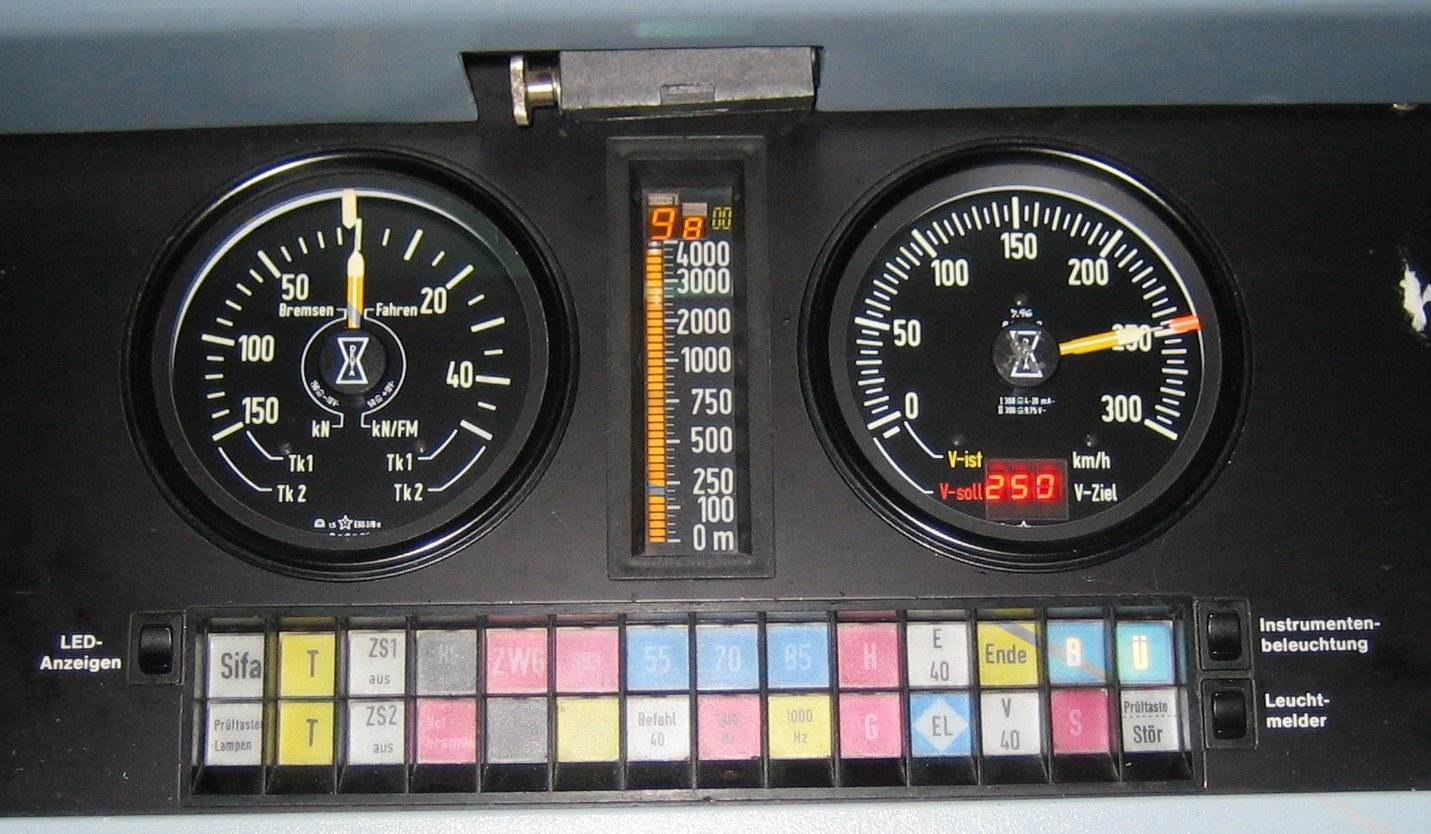
Main console of an ICE 2 train in LZB mode. The current, the maximum and the target speed is 250 km/h. The target distance is 9.8 km

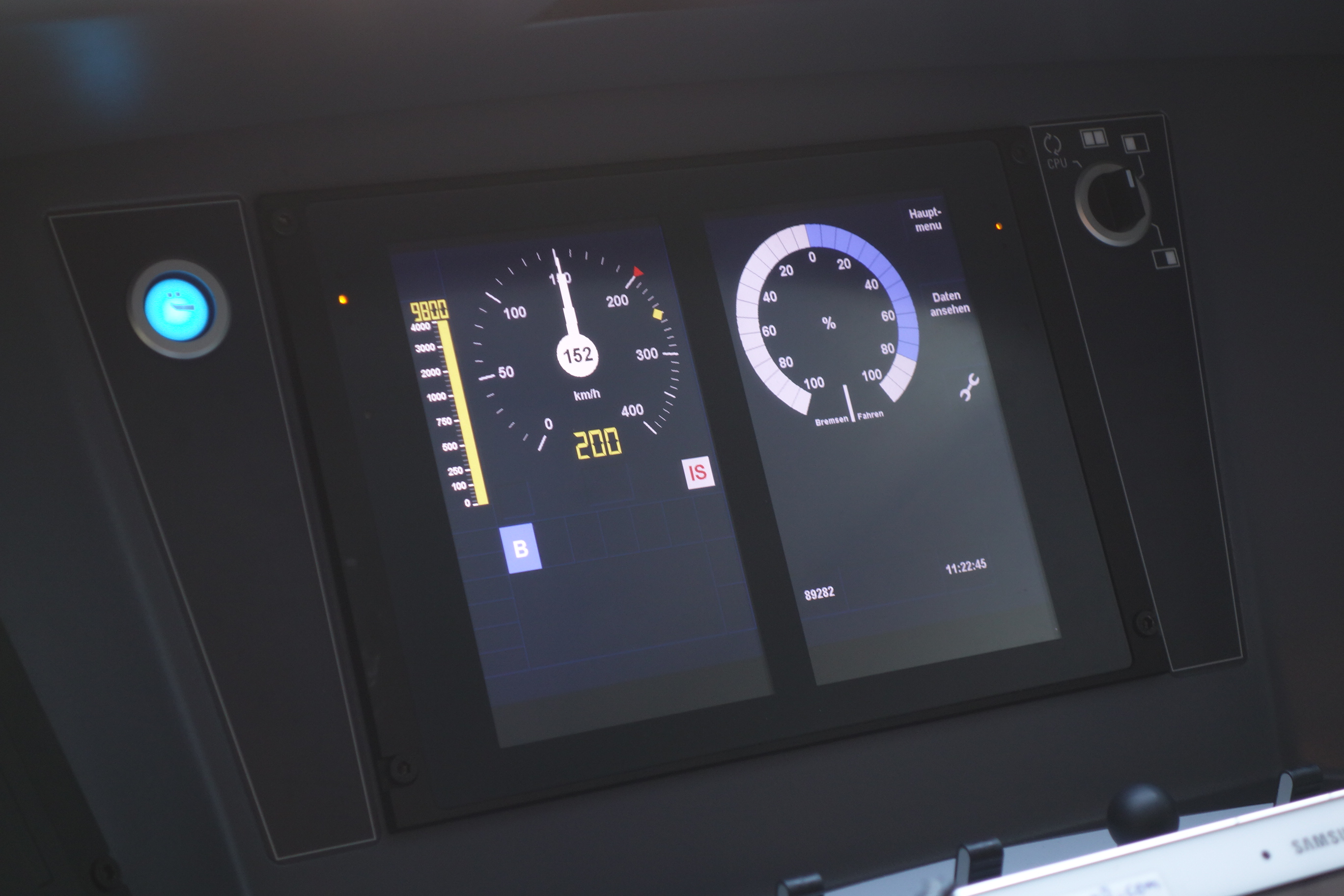
The Driver Machine Interface (DMI) panel of an ICE 4 train in LZB (STM) mode, showing a maximum target speed of 200 km/h

In Germany the standard distance from a distant signal to its home signal is 1,000 metres (3,300 ft). On a train with strong brakes, this is the braking distance from 160 km/h. In the 1960s Germany evaluated various options to increase speeds, including increasing the distance between distant and home signals, and cab signalling. Increasing the distance between the home and distant signals would decrease capacity. Adding another aspect would make the signals harder to recognize. In either case, changes to the conventional signals wouldn't solve the problem of the difficulty of seeing and reacting to the signals at higher speeds. To overcome these problems, Germany chose to develop continuous cab signalling.

The LZB cab signalling system was first demonstrated in 1965, enabling daily trains at the International Transport Exhibition in Munich to run at 200 km/h. The system was further developed throughout the 1970s, then released on various lines in Germany in the early 1980s and on German, Spanish, and Austrian high-speed lines in the 1990s with trains running up to 300 km/h (190 mph). Meanwhile, additional capabilities were built into the system.

LZB consists of equipment on the line as well as on the trains. A 30–40 km segment of track is controlled by a LZB control centre. The control centre computer receives information about occupied blocks from track circuits or axle counters and locked routes from interlockings. It is programmed with the track configuration including the location of points, turnouts, gradients, and curve speed limits. With this, it has sufficient information to calculate how far each train may proceed and at what speed.

The control centre communicates with the train using two conductor cables that run between the tracks and are crossed every 100 m. The control centre sends data packets, known as telegrams, to the vehicle which give it its movement authority (how far it can proceed and at what speed) and the vehicle sends back data packets indicating its configuration, braking capabilities, speed, and position.

The train's on-board computer processes the packets and displays the following information to the driver:

- Current speed: locally derived from speed sensing equipment - shown with a standard speedometer
- Permitted speed: maximum allowed speed now - shown with a red line or triangle on the outside of the speedometer
- Target speed: maximum speed at a certain distance - shown with LED numbers at the bottom of the speedometer
- Target distance: distance for target speed - shown with LED bars showing up to 4000 m, with numbers for longer distances

If there is a long distance free in front of the train the driver will see the target speed and permitted speed equal to the maximum line speed, with the distance showing the maximum distance, between 4 km and 13.2 km depending on the unit, train, and line.

As the train approaches a speed restriction, such as one for a curve or turnout, LZB will sound a buzzer and display the distance to and speed of the restriction. As the train continues the target distance will decrease. As the train nears the speed restriction the permitted speed will start to decrease, ending up at the target speed at the restriction. At that point the display will change to the next target.

The LZB system treats a red signal or the beginning of a block containing a train as a speed restriction of 0 speed. The driver will see the same sequence as approaching a speed restriction except the target speed is 0.

LZB includes Automatic Train Protection. If the driver exceeds the permitted speed plus a margin LZB will activate the buzzer and an overspeed light. If the driver fails to slow the train the LZB system can apply the brakes itself, bringing the train to a halt if necessary.

LZB also includes an Automatic Train Operation system known as AFB (Automatische Fahr- und Bremssteuerung, automatic driving and braking control), which enables the driver to let the computer drive the train on auto-pilot, automatically driving at the maximum speed currently allowed by the LZB. In this mode, the driver only monitors the train and watches for unexpected obstacles on the tracks.

Finally, the LZB vehicle system includes the conventional Indusi (or PZB) train protection system for use on lines not equipped with LZB.

== History ==
=== Choice of cab signalling ===
In the 1960s, the German railways wanted to increase the speeds of some of their railway lines. One issue in doing so is signalling. German signals are placed too close to allow high-speed trains to stop between them, and signals may be difficult for train drivers to see at high speeds.

Germany uses distant signals placed 1,000 m (3,300 ft) before the main signal. Trains with conventional brakes, decelerating at 0.76 m/s^{2} (2.5 ft/s^{2}), can stop from 140 km/h (87 mph) in that distance. Trains with strong brakes, usually including electromagnetic track brakes, decelerating at 1 m/s^{2} (3.3 ft/s^{2}) can stop from 160 km/h (99 mph) and are allowed to travel that speed. However, even with strong brakes and the same deceleration, a train travelling 200 km/h (120 mph) would require 1,543 m (5,062 ft) to stop, exceeding the signalling distance. Furthermore, as the energy dissipated at a given acceleration increases with speed, higher speeds may require lower decelerations to avoid overheating the brakes, further increasing the distance.

One possibility to increase speed would be to increase the distance between the main and distant signal. But, this would require longer blocks, which would decrease line capacity for slower trains. Another solution would be to introduce multiple aspect signalling. A train travelling at 200 km/h (120 mph) would see a "slow to 160" signal in the first block and then a stop signal in the 2nd block.

Introducing multi-aspect signalling would require substantial reworking for the existing lines, as additional distant signals would need to be added onto long blocks and the signals reworked on shorter ones. In addition, it wouldn't solve the other problem with high-speed operation, the difficulty of seeing signals as a train rushes past, especially in marginal conditions such as rain, snow, and fog.

Cab signalling solves these problems. For existing lines it can be added on top of the existing signalling system with little, if any, modifications to the existing system. Bringing the signals inside the cab makes it easy for the driver to see them. On top of these, the LZB cab signalling system has other advantages:

- The driver is immediately aware of signalling changes.
  - This allows a driver to stop slowing down if a signal at the end of a block improves, saving energy and time.
  - It also allows the control centre to instantly signal stop in the case of dangerous conditions such as a derailment or avalanche.
- The driver can electronically "see" a long distance (up to 13 km) down the track, allowing them to drive the train more smoothly.
- A train following a slower train can "see" the slower train well in advance, coasting or using regenerative braking to slow and thereby save energy.
- It can signal a variety of speeds. (Conventional German signals in the 1960s could only signal 40 or 60 km/h (25 or 37 mph) for turnouts. Modern conventional German signals can signal any 10 km/h (6.2 mph) increment, but LZB can signal even finer increments.)
- It allows the track to be divided up into a large number of small blocks if necessary to increase capacity.
- It enables a more capable Automatic Train Protection system.
- It enables the AFB Automatic Train Operation system.

Given all of these advantages, in the 1960s, the German railways chose to go with LZB cab signalling instead of increasing the signal spacing or adding aspects.

=== Development ===
The first prototype system was developed by German Federal Railways in conjunction with Siemens and tested in 1963. It was installed in Class 103 locomotives and presented in 1965 with 200 km/h (120 mph) runs on trains to the International Exhibition in Munich. From this Siemens developed the LZB 100 system and introduced it on the Munich-Augsburg-Donauwörth and Hanover-Celle-Uelzen lines, all in Class 103 locomotives. The system was overlaid on the existing signal system. All trains would obey the standard signals, but LZB-equipped trains could run faster than normal as long as the track was clear ahead for a sufficient distance. LZB 100 could display up to 5 km (3.1 mi) in advance.

The original installations were all hard-wired logic. However, as the 1970s progressed Standard Elektrik Lorenz (SEL) developed the computer-based LZB L72 central controllers and equipped other lines with them.

By the late 1970s, with the development of microprocessors, the 2-out-of-3 computers could be applied to on-board equipment. Siemens and SEL jointly developed the LZB 80 on-board system and equipped all locomotives and trains that travel over 160 km/h (99 mph) plus some heavy haul locomotives. By 1991, Germany replaced all LZB 100 equipment with LZB 80/L 72.

When Germany built its high-speed lines, beginning with the Fulda-Würzburg segment that started operation in 1988, it incorporated LZB into the lines. The lines were divided into blocks about 1.5 to 2.5 km (0.93 to 1.55 mi) long, but instead of having a signal for every block, there are only fixed signals at switches and stations, with approximately 7 km (4.3 mi) between them. If there was no train for the entire distance the entry signal would be green. If the first block was occupied it would be red as usual. Otherwise, if the first block was free and a LZB train approached the signal would be dark and the train would proceed on LZB indications alone.

The system has spread to other countries. The Spanish equipped their first high-speed line, operating at 300 km/h (190 mph), with LZB. It opened in 1992 and connects Madrid, Cordoba, and Seville. In 1987 the Austrian railways introduced LZB into their systems, and with the 23 May 1993 timetable change introduced EuroCity trains running 200 km/h (120 mph) on a 25 km (16 mi)-long section of the Westbahn between Linz and Wels.

Siemens continued to develop the system, with "Computer Integrated Railroading", or "CIR ELKE", lineside equipment in 1999. This permitted shorter blocks and allowed speed restrictions for switches to start at the switch instead of at a block boundary. See CIR ELKE below for details.

=== Development timeline ===
Date	Description	Control centres / Length
1963	Testing on Forchheim–Bamberg line	
1965	200 km/h presentation trips on the Munich–Augsburg line installed in Class 103 locomotives	
1974–1976	Operations testing on the Bremen–Hamburg line	3 controllers / 90 km or 56 mi
1976	Expanded the trial to the Hamm–Gütersloh line.	
1978–1980	S-Bahn pilot project in Madrid (Renfe)	1 controller / 28 km or 17 mi
1980–1985	Operations start on some Deutschen Bundesbahn (DB) lines	7 controllers / 309 km or 192 mi
1987	Operations start on new high-speed lines Fulda–Würzburg and Mannheim–Hockenheim	4 controllers / 125 km or 78 mi
1987	Austrian Federal Railways decides to introduce LZB	
1988–1990	Further expansion to new routes in Germany	2 controllers / 190 km or 120 mi
1991	Commissioning of the remainder of the Hanover–Würzburg high-speed railway, the Mannheim–Stuttgart high-speed railway and additional routes	10 controllers / 488 km or 303 mi
1992	Opening of the Madrid-Sevilla high-speed rail line in Spain	8 controllers / 480 km or 300 mi
1992	First section Wien–Salzburg route in Austria	1 controller / 30 km or 19 mi
1995	Commissioning of the Madrid C5 Cercanias (suburban rail) line	2 controllers / 45 km or 28 mi
1998	Commissioning of the Hanover–Berlin high-speed railway and expansion of the Nuremberg–Würzburg railway, paired with electronic interlockings.	6 controllers
1999	Commissioning of the CIR ELKE pilot project on the Offenburg–Basel line, with CE1 system software	4 controllers
2001	Commissioning of the CIR ELKE pilot project at Achern	1 controller
2002	Commissioning of the Cologne–Frankfurt high-speed rail line using CE2 system software	4 controllers
2003	Commissioning of the upgrades to the Cologne–Düren(–Aachen) rail line (LZB with CE2-Software)	1 controller / 40 km or 25 mi
2004	Commissioning of the upgrades to the Hamburg–Berlin line (LZB with CE2 system software)	5 controllers
2004	Commissioning on the upgrades to the Munich S-Bahn using (CE2 software and shorter blocks)	1 controller
2006	Commissioning on the upgrades to the Berlin–Halle/Leipzig line where LZB (CE2) and ETCS are combined for the first time.	4 controllers
2006	Commissioning of the Nuremberg–Munich high-speed railway (LZB with CE2 system software with turnout extension)	2 controllers

== Line equipment ==
=== Cable loops ===
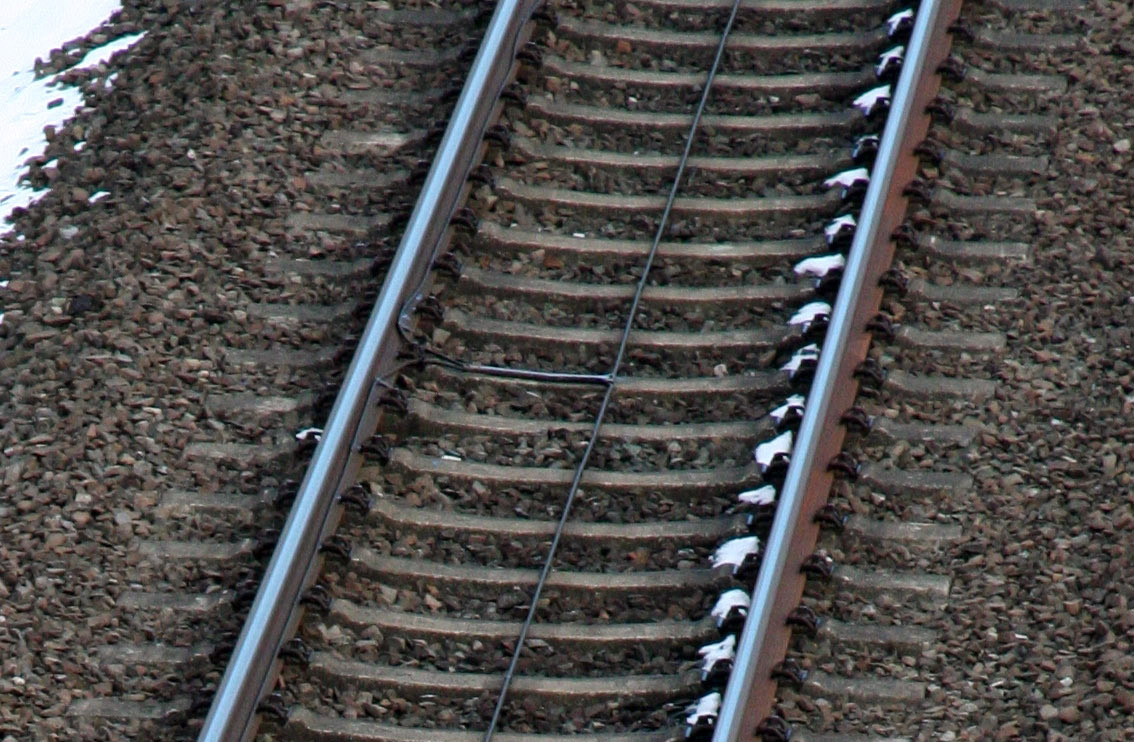
Cable loop

The LZB control centre communicates with the train using conductor cable loops. Loops can be as short as 50 metres long, as used at the entrance and exit to LZB controlled track, or as long as 12.7 km (7.9 mi). Where the loops are longer than 100 m (328 ft) they are crossed every 100 m (328 ft). At the crossing the signal phase angle is changed by 180° reducing electrical interference between the track and the train as well as long-distance radiation of the signal. The train detects this crossing and uses it to help determine its position. Longer loops are generally fed from the middle rather than an end.

One disadvantage of very long loops is that any break in the cable will disable LZB transmission for the entire section, up to 12.7 km (7.9 mi). Thus, newer LZB installations, including all high-speed lines, break the cable loops into 300 m (984 ft) physical cables. Each cable is fed from a repeater, and all of the cables in a section will transmit the same information.

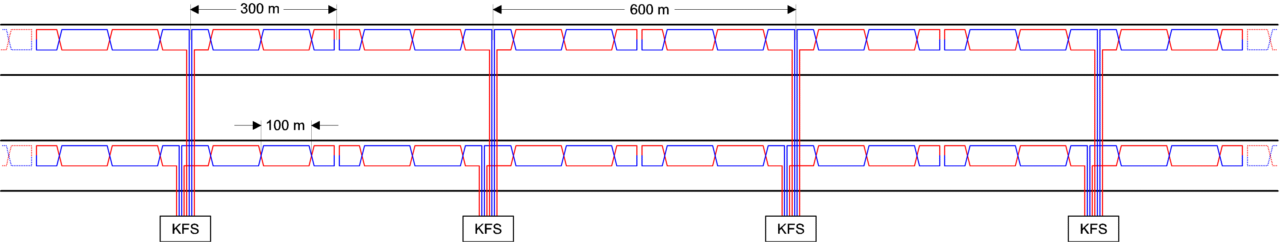
Short loop cable configuration.

=== LZB route centre (central controller) ===
The core of the LZB route centre, or central controller, consists of a 2-of-3 computer system with two computers connected to the outputs and an extra for standby. Each computer has its own power supply and is in its own frame. All 3 computers receive and process inputs and interchange their outputs and important intermediate results. If one disagrees it is disabled and the standby computer takes its place.

The computers are programmed with fixed information from the route such as speed limits, gradients, and the location of block boundaries, switches, and signals. They are linked by LAN or cables to the interlocking system from which they receive indications of switch positions, signal indications, and track circuit or axle counter occupancy. Finally, the route centre's computers communicates with controlled trains via the cable loops previously described.

=== Other equipment ===
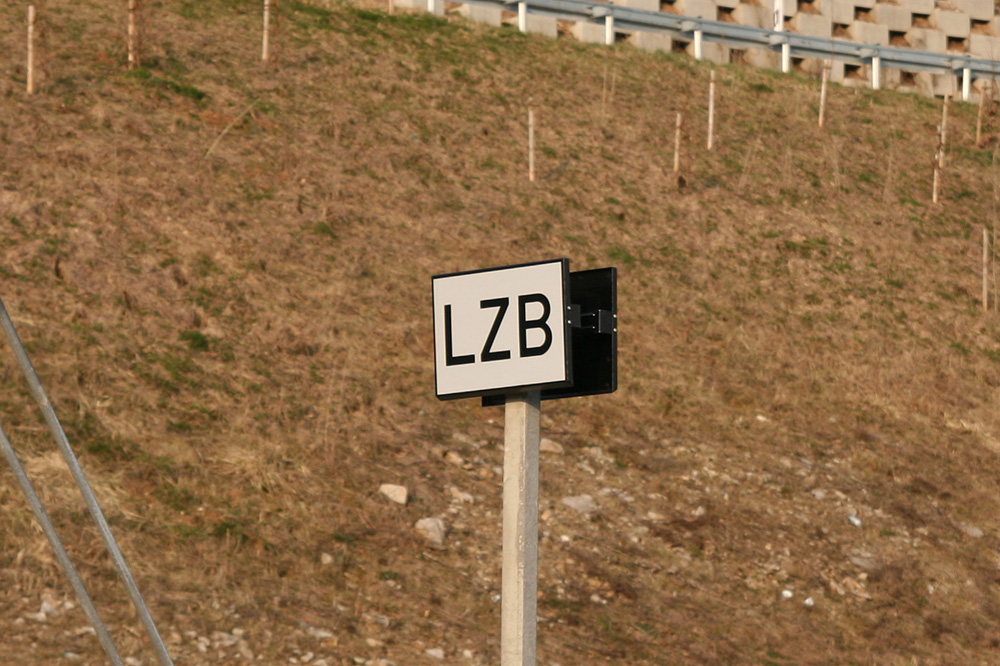
Start of LZB sign

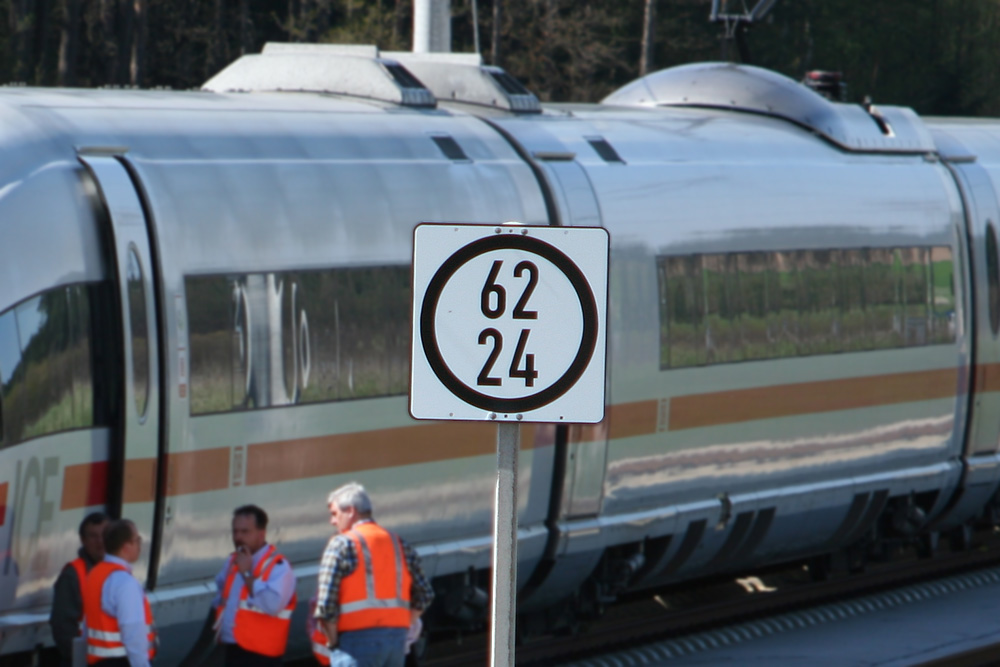
Sign indicating a new (virtual) LZB block

- Repeaters: Repeaters connect individual 300 m (984 ft) long loop sections to the primary communication links, strengthening the signal from the route centre and sending the vehicle responses.
- Fixed loops: Fixed loops, typically about 50 m (164 ft) long, are placed at the ends of the controlled section. They transmit fixed telegrams which allow entering trains to receive an address.
- Isolation cabinets: A long communication link will consist of multiple individual cables connected in "isolation cabinets" which serve to prevent the low-frequency voltage which is coupled from the catenary from accumulating on the cable.
- Signs: Signs indicate the LZB block boundaries (if not at a signal) and the entrance and exit from the LZB controlled area.

== Vehicle equipment ==
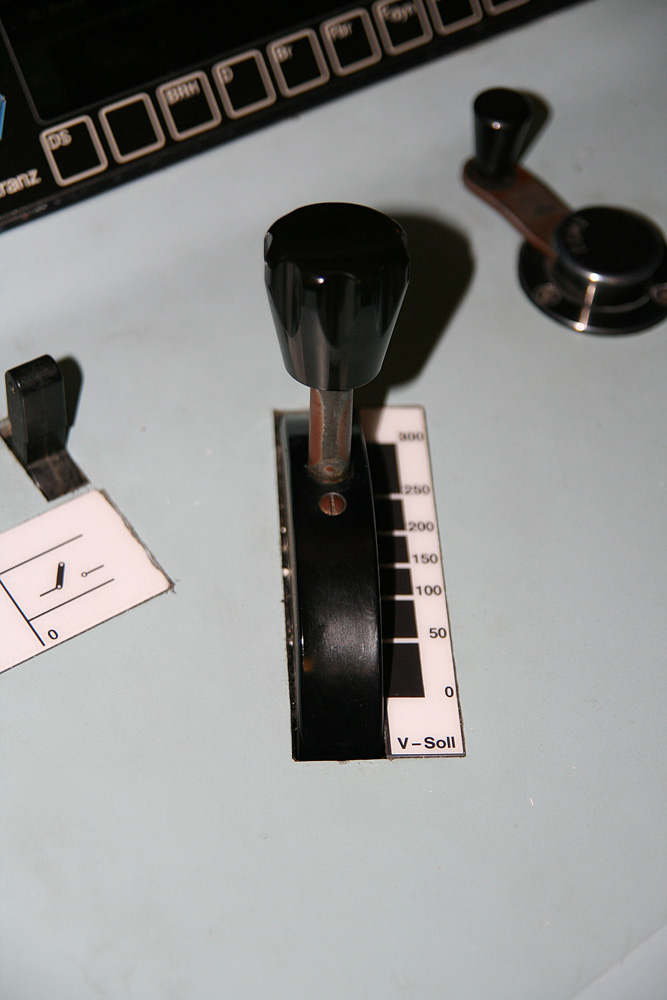
The AFB (cruise control) lever in the driver's cab of an ICE 1 train, with predefined maximum speed limits in km/h (V_{soll}) labelled on the right. When in operation on LZB-enabled track, the AFB system automatically maintains the maximum speed that is defined by said power lever, as well as automatic speed reduction and braking of the train if necessary.

The vehicle equipment in the original LZB80 designed consisted of:

- Computers: The on-board equipment centred around a 2-of-3 computer system. The original LZB 80 design used 8085 microprocessors programmed in assembly language. The programs were interrupt driven, with interrupts generated by a 70 ms clock, the track receivers and transmitters, the serial interface, and also within the program itself. Interrupts triggered comparison and output programs. Peripheral equipment was arranged around the computers with all interfaces electrically separated and all grounds tied to the cabinet frame which was tied to the vehicle chassis.
- Redundant power supply: The computers and peripheral equipment were supplied with a redundant power supply based on two identical voltage transformers. Each was capable of supplying the power necessary for all of the equipment. They were normally alternately switched, but if one failed the other would take over. On-board batteries could also supply temporary power.
- Odometry: The vehicle speed and distance travelled is measured on two independent channels by two pulse generators mounted on different axles. Each is linked to a separate micro-controller based unit used to correct any inaccuracies. The central logic polls the two units as well as an accelerometer, compares the values and checks for plausibility.
- Receiver: Two pairs of receiving antennas are each fed to selective, self-regulating amplifiers whose output is fed to a demodulator and then a serial-parallel transformer. The received telegrams are then fed byte by byte to the central logic computer. The receivers also indicate transition points and whether the signal is present.
- Transmitter: The 2 out putting computers feed serial-parallel transformers. They are compared after conversion, and transmission is only allowed if they are identical. Only one signal is actually transmitted, with the transmitter transmitting the two signals at 56 kHz with the signals displaced by a 90° phase angle.
- Emergency brake connection: The computers are connected to the brake via a relay. A computer command or loss of current will release the air from the brake pipe applying the emergency brake.
- Indusi horn connection: The horn signalling the driver is also connected by a relay.
- Serial interface: A serial interface is used to connect the rest of the components, including the driver inputs, display unit, logger, and the automatic drive and brake control (AFB) to the computers. Telegrams are transmitted cyclically both from and to the computers.
- Driver input unit: The driver inputs train related data such as the type of braking (passenger/freight), braking potential, maximum train speed, and train length on the driver interface unit. This is then displayed to the driver to verify that it is correct.
- Modular cab display (MFA): The modular cab display shows the relevant speeds and distances to the driver as described in the overview.
- Automatic drive/brake control: When enabled by the driver, the automatic drive/brake control unit (AFB) will drive the train following the permitted speed. When not operating on an LZB equipped line, i.e. under Indusi operation, the AFB acts mainly as a "cruise control", driving according to the speed set by the driver.

The equipment in newer trains is similar, although the details may vary. For example, some vehicles use radar rather than accelerometers to aid in their odometry. The number of antennas may vary by vehicle. Finally, some newer vehicles use a full-screen computer generated "Man-machine interface" (MMI) display rather than the separate dials of the "Modular cab display" (MFA).

== Operation ==
=== Telegrams ===
LZB operates by exchanging telegrams between the central controller and the trains. The central controller transmits a "call telegram" using Frequency-shift keying (FSK) signalling at 1200 bits per second on a 36 kHz ± 0.4 kHz. The train replies with a "response telegram" at 600 bits per second at 56 kHz ± 0.2 kHz.

==== Call telegram format ====
Call telegrams are 83.5 bits long:

- Start sequence: Synchronization: 5.5 bits, Start element + baker code: 3 bits
- Address: Section ID: A-E, A1-A3, Location: 1-127 or 255-128
- Vehicle information: Travel direction: up/down, Braking type: passenger/freight, Brake curve number: 1-10, A-B
- Braking information: Distance to brake application: 0–1,550 m (0–5,085 ft)
- Nominal distance XG: 0–12,775 m (0–41,913 ft), Target information, Distance: 0–2,700 m (0–8,858 ft), Speed: 0–320 km/h (0–199 mph)
- Display information, Signal information: 3 bits, Additional information: 5 bits
- Auxiliary information: Group identity: 1-4 - Indicates response type required, Line identity: new high-speed/normal main lines, Central controller type: LZB 100/72
- Cyclic redundancy check (CRC): 8 bits

One might note that there is no "train identification" field in the telegram. Instead, a train is identified by position. See Zones and Addressing for more details.

==== Response telegram format ====
There are 4 types of response telegrams, each 41 bits long. The exact type of telegram a train sends depends on the "Group identity" in the call telegram.

The most common type of telegram is type 1, which is used to signal a train's position and speed to the central controller. It contains the following fields: {LZB p3}

- Synchronization and start sequence: 6 bits
- Group identity: 1-4 - Indicates response type
- Vehicle location acknowledgement: number of zones advanced = ±0, ±1, ±2
- Location within zone: 0–87.5 m (0–287 ft) (in 12.5 m or 41 ft increments)
- Braking type: passenger/freight
- Brake curve number: 16 possible brake curves
- Actual speed: 0–320 km/h (0–199 mph)
- Operational and diagnostic information: 5 bits
- Cyclic redundancy check (CRC): 7 bits

The other telegrams are used primarily when a train enters the LZB controlled section. They all start with the same synchronization and start sequence and a "group identity" to identify the telegram type, and end with the CRC. Their data fields vary as follows:

- Type 2: Vehicle location acknowledgement, location within zone, braking type, brake curve number, maximum train speed, train length
- Type 3: Railway, train number
- Type 4: Locomotive/train series, serial number, train length

=== Entry into LZB, zones and addressing ===
Before entering an LZB controlled section the driver must enable the train by entering the required information on the Driver Input Unit and enabling LZB. When enabled the train will light a "B" light.

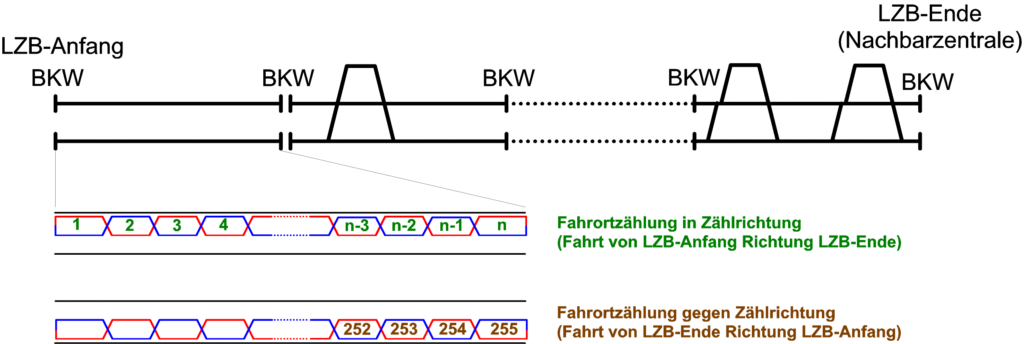
LZB Topology

A controlled section of track is divided into up to 127 zones, each 100 m (328 ft) long. The zones are consecutively numbered, counting up from 1 in one direction and down from 255 in the opposite.

When a train enters a LZB controlled section of track, it will normally pass over a fixed loop that transmits a "change of section identification" (BKW) telegram. This telegram indicates to the train the section identification number as well as the starting zone, either 1 or 255. The train sends back an acknowledgement telegram. At that time the LZB indications are switched on, including the "Ü" light to indicate that LZB is running.

From that point on the train's location is used to identify a train. When a train enters a new zone it sends a response telegram with the "vehicle location acknowledgement" filed indicating that it has advanced into a new zone. The central controller will then use the new zone when addressing the train in the future. Thus a trains address will gradually increase or decrease, depending on its direction, as it travels along the track. A train identifies that it has entered a new zone by either detecting the cable transposition point in the cable or when it has travelled 100 metres (328 ft). A train can miss detecting up to 3 transposition points and still remain under LZB control.

The procedure for entering LZB controlled track is repeated when a train transitions from one controlled section to another. The train receives a new "change of section identification" telegram and gets a new address.

Until the train knows its address it will ignore any telegrams received. Thus, if a train doesn't properly enter into the controlled section it won't be under LZB control until the next section.

=== Speed signalling ===
The main task of LZB is signalling to the train the speed and distance it is allowed to travel. It does this by transmitting periodic call telegrams to each train one to five times per second, depending on the number of trains present. Four fields in the call telegram are particularly relevant:

- Target distance.
- Target speed.
- Nominal stopping distance, known as "XG" (See below).
- Distance to brake application point.

The target speed and location are used to display the target speed and distance to the driver. The train's permitted speed is calculated using the trains braking curve, which can vary by train type, and the XG location, which is the distance from the start of the 100 m (328 ft) zone that is used to address the train. If the train is approaching a red signal or the beginning of an occupied block the location will match the location of the signal or block boundary. The on-board equipment will calculate the permitted speed at any point so that the train, decelerating at the deceleration indicated by its braking curve, will stop by the stopping point.

A train will have a parabolic braking curve as follows:

$$V_{\rm permitted} = \sqrt{ 2 \cdot decel \cdot (XG-dist)}$$

where:

- decel = deceleration
- dist = distance from beginning of 100 m (328 ft) zone

Where a train is approaching a speed restriction the control centre will transmit a packet with an XG location set to a point behind the speed restriction such that a train, decelerating based on its braking curve, will arrive at the correct speed at the start of the speed restriction. This, as well as deceleration to zero speed, is illustrated with the green line in the "Permitted and supervised speed calculation" figure.

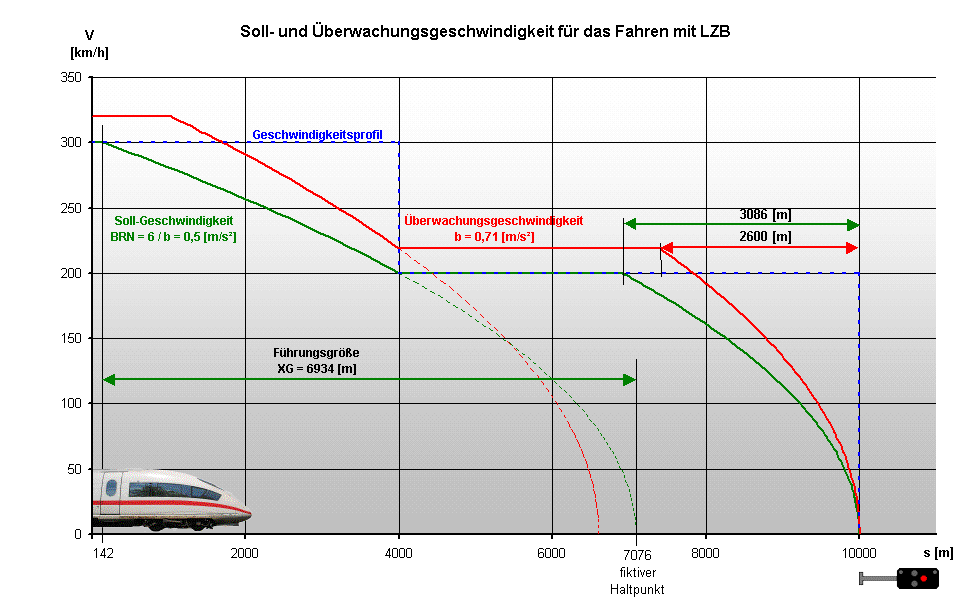
Permitted and supervised speed calculation

The red line in the figure shows the "monitoring speed", which is the speed which, if exceeded, the train will automatically apply the emergency brakes. When running at constant speed this is 8.75 km/h (5.44 mph) above the permitted speed for transited emergency braking (until speed is reduced) or 13.75 km/h (8.54 mph) above the permitted speed for continuous emergency braking. When approaching a stopping point, the monitoring speed follows a braking curve similar to the permitted speed, but with a higher deceleration, that will bring it to zero at the stopping point. When approaching a speed restriction, the monitoring speed braking curve intersects the speed restriction point at 8.75 km/h (5.44 mph) above the constant speed.

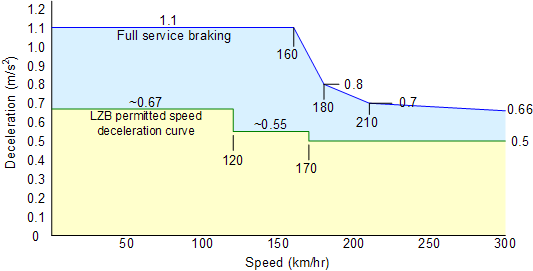
ICE full-service braking and LZB deceleration

Deceleration rates are more conservative with LZB than with conventional German signalling. A typical passenger train braking curve might have a "permitted speed" deceleration of 0.5 m/s^{2} (1.6 ft/s^{2}) and a "monitoring speed" deceleration of 0.71 m/s^{2} (2.3 ft/s^{2}) 42% higher than the deceleration for the permitted speed, but lower than the 0.76 m/s^{2} (2.5 ft/s^{2}) required to stop from 140 km/h (87 mph) in 1,000 m (3,281 ft) used in conventional signalling. The ICE3, which has a full service braking deceleration of 1.1 m/s^{2} (3.6 ft/s^{2}) below 160 km/h (99 mph), dropping to 0.65 m/s^{2} (2.1 ft/s^{2}) by 300 km/h (190 mph), has a LZB target speed deceleration of only 0.68 m/s^{2} (2.2 ft/s^{2}) to 120 km/h (75 mph), 0.55 m/s^{2} (1.8 ft/s^{2}) between 120 and 170 km/h (75 and 106 mph), and 0.5 m/s^{2} (1.6 ft/s^{2}) at higher speeds.

In between the permitted speed and monitoring speed is a warning speed, normally 5 km/h (3.1 mph) above the permitted speed. If the train exceeds that speed LZB will flash the "G" light on the train's display and sound a horn.

=== Leaving LZB ===
About 1,700 m (5,577 ft) before the end of the LZB controlled section the central controller will send a telegram to announce the end of LZB control. The train will flash the "ENDE" light which the driver must acknowledge within 10 seconds. The display will normally give the distance and target speed at the end of the controlled section, which will depend on the signal at that point.

When the train reaches the end of LZB control the "Ü" and "ENDE" lights go off and the conventional Indusi (or PZB) system takes over automatic train protection.

=== Special operating modes ===
Special conditions not covered by the full LZB system or failures can put LZB into one of the special operating modes.

==== Crossover to opposite track ====
As a train approaches a crossover to a normally opposite direction track the display will flash the "E/40" light. The driver confirms the indication and the permitted speed drops following the braking curve to 40 km/h (25 mph). When the crossover section is reached the displays are switched off and the driver can proceed through the crossover at 40 km/h (25 mph).

==== Drive by sight signal ====
German signalling systems have a "drive by sight" signal that consists of 3 yellow lights forming a V-shaped triangle with one light at the bottom. This signal, labelled "Zs 7", is placed with a fixed line side signal and, when lighted, permits the driver to pass a fixed red or defective signal and drive by sight to the end of the interlocking no faster than 40 km/h (25 mph).

When approaching such a signal in LZB territory the "E/40" light will be lit until 250 m (820 ft) before the signal, then the "E/40" will go dark and "V40" will flash. The "V40" signal indicates the ability to drive by sight.

==== Transmission failure ====
If data exchange is interrupted, the trains distance measurement system fails, or the train fails to detect 4 or more cable transposition points the LZB system will go into a failure state. It will light the "Stör" indicator and then flash "Ü". The driver must acknowledge the indications within 10 seconds. The driver must slow the train to no more than 85 km/h (53 mph) or lower; the exact speed depends on the backup signalling system in place.

== Extensions ==
=== CIR ELKE-I ===
CIR-ELKE is an improvement on the basic LZB system. It uses the same physical interface and packets as standard LZB but upgrades its software, adding capabilities and modifying some procedures. It is designed to increase line capacity by up to 40% and to further shorten travel times. The name is an abbreviation of the English/German project title Computer Integrated Railroading - Erhöhung der Leistungsfähigkeit im Kernnetz der Eisenbahn (Computer Integrated Railroading - Increase Capacity in the Core Railway Network). Being an extension of LZB it is also called LZB-CIR-ELKE further abbreviated into LZB-CE.

CIR-ELKE includes the following improvements:

- Shorter blocks - CIR-ELKE blocks can be as short as 300 metres (984 ft), or even shorter for S-Bahn systems. The Munich S-Bahn system has blocks as short as 50 metres (164 ft) at the beginning of the platform, allowing a train to pull into the platform as another is leaving and making it capable of running 30 trains per hour.
- Speed changes at any location - The standard LZB system required that speed restrictions start at block boundaries. With CIR-ELKE speed restrictions can start at any point, such as at a turnout. This means a train doesn't have to slow down as soon, increasing average speeds.
- Telegram evaluation changes - In order to increase safety on a system with shorter intervals between trains CIR-ELKE sends identical telegrams twice. The train will only act on a telegram if it receives two identical valid telegrams. In order to compensate for the increase in the number of telegrams CIR-ELKE sends telegrams to non-moving trains less frequently.

=== CIR ELKE-II ===
The original LZB system was designed for permitted speeds up to 280 km/h (170 mph) and gradients up to 1.25%. The Cologne–Frankfurt high-speed rail line was designed for 300 km/h (190 mph) operation and has 4% gradients; thus, it needed a new version of LZB, and CIR ELKE-II was developed for this line.

CIR ELKE-II has the following features:

- Maximum speed of 300 km/h (190 mph).
- Support for braking curves with higher decelerations and curves taking into account the actual altitude profile of the distance ahead instead of assuming the maximum down slope of the section. This makes operation on 4% gradients practical.
- Support for target distances of up to 35,000 m (114,829 ft) to a stopping or speed restriction point. If there is no such point within that distance the system will display a target distance of 13,000 m (42,651 ft) and a target speed of the line speed.
- Support for enabling the Eddy current brake of the ICE3 trains. By default, the eddy current brake is enabled for emergency braking only. With CE2 it is possible to enable it for service braking, too.
- Signalling voltage or phase changes.
- Audible warning signals 8 seconds before the point of braking, or 4 seconds for the Munich S-Bahn, instead of 1,000 m (3,281 ft) before or with a 30 km/h (19 mph) speed difference done previously.

== Malfunctions ==
- On 29 June 1991, after a disturbance, the train driver had the LZB system off and passed a stop signal with two trains in the tunnel at Jühnde on the Hanover-Würzburg high-speed line.
- On 29 June 2001, there was nearly a serious accident at the Oschatz crossover on the Leipzig-Dresden railway line. The crossover was set to diverging with a 100 km/h (62 mph) speed limit but the LZB system displayed a 180 km/h (112 mph) limit. The driver of ICE 1652 recognized the diverging signal and managed to slow down to 170 km/h (106 mph) before the crossing and the train did not derail. A software error in the LZB computer was suspected as the cause.
- A similar near-accident occurred on 17 November 2001 in Bienenbüttel on the Hamburg-Hanover rail line. In order to pass a failed freight train an ICE train crossed over to the opposite track going 185 km/h (115 mph) through a crossover that was rated at 80 km/h (50 mph). The suspected cause was the faulty execution of a change to the interlocking system where the crossover speed was increased from 60 to 80 km/h (37 to 50 mph). Without that speed restriction the LZB system did continue to show the 200 km/h (120 mph) pass-through line speed on the in-cab display - the train driver applied the brakes on recognizing the line-side signal lights set to diverge and the train did not derail.
- On 9 April 2002 on the Hanover-Berlin high-speed rail line, a fault in the LZB line centre computer brought four LZB controlled trains to a stop with two trains in each line direction being halted in the same signalling block (Teilblockmodus - divided block control). When the computer was rebooted it signalled 0 km/h (0 mph) to the trains in front and 160 km/h (99 mph) to the following trains. The drivers of the following trains did not proceed however - one driver saw the train in front of him and the other driver double-checked with the operations centre which had warned him prior to departure, so two possible collisions were averted. As a consequence of this incident, the two mainline train operators (DB Cargo and DB Passenger Transport) issued an instruction to their drivers to be especially cautious during periods of LZB outage when the system is running in divided block mode. The cause turned out to be a software error.

== Equipped lines ==
=== DB (Germany) ===
Lines equipped with Linienzugbeeinflussung (red) and ETCS (blue) in Germany (as of December 2020)

The following lines of Deutsche Bahn are equipped with LZB, allowing for speeds in excess of 160 km/h (providing the general suitability of the track):

- Augsburg - Dinkelscherben - Ulm (km 7.3 - km 28.5)
- Berlin - Nauen - Glöwen - Wittenberge - Hagenow Land - Rothenburgsort - Hamburg (km 16.5 - km 273.1)
- Bremen - Hamburg (km 253.9 - km 320.1)
- Dortmund - Hamm (Westf) - Bielefeld (except for the station of Hamm)
- Frankfurt am Main - Gelnhausen - Fulda (km 24.8 - km 40.3)
- Hannover - Stadthagen - Minden (km 4.4 - km 53.4)
- Hannover - Celle - Uelzen - Lüneburg - Hamburg (km 4.0 - km 166.5)
- Hannover - Göttingen - Kassel-Wilhelmshöhe - Fulda - Würzburg (km 4.2 - km 325.6)
- Karlsruhe - Achern - Offenburg - Kenzingen - Leutersberg - Weil am Rhein - Basel Bad. Bf. (km 102.2 - km 270.6)
- Köln - Aachen (km 1,9 - km 41,8)
- Köln - Düsseldorf - Duisburg (km 6.7 - km 37.3 and km 40.1 - km 62.2; Düsseldorf main station is not equipped)
- Köln - Troisdorf - Montabaur - Limburg a.d. Lahn - Frankfurt am Main (km 8.7 - km 172.6)
- Leipzig - Wurzen - Dresden (km 3.6 - km 59.5)
- Lengerich (Westf) - Münster (Westf)
- Lehrte - Stendal - Berlin-Spandau
- Mannheim - Karlsruhe
- Mannheim - Vaihingen an der Enz - Stuttgart (km 2.1 - km 99.5)
- München - Augsburg - Donauwörth (km 9,2 - km 56.3 and km 2.7 - km 39.8; Augsburg main station is not equipped)
- Nürnberg - Allersberg - Kinding - Ingolstadt-Nord (ABS: km 97.9 - km 91.6; NBS: km 9.0 - km 88.7)
- Nürnberg - Neustadt an der Aisch - Würzburg (km 34.8 - km 62.7)
- Osnabrück - Bremen (km 139.7 - km 232.0)
- Paderborn - Lippstadt - Soest - Hamm (Westf) (Strecke 1760: km 125.2 - km 180.8; Strecke 2930: km 111.5 - km 135.6)
- Zeppelinheim bei Frankfurt/Main - Mannheim

Note: italics indicate the physical location of an LZB control centre.

=== ÖBB (Austria) ===
The West railway (Vienna–Salzburg) is equipped with LZB in three sections:

- St. Pölten–Ybbs an der Donau (km 62.4–km 108.6)
- Amstetten–St. Valentin (km 125.9–km 165.0)
- Linz–Attnang-Puchheim (km 190.5–km 241.6)

=== Adif (Spain) ===
- Madrid - Córdoba - Sevilla (9 centres / 480 km), operational since 1992. Since 2004, the terminus Madrid Atocha is also equipped with LZB. In November 2005, a branch line to Toledo was opened. (20 km).
- Cercanías Madrid line C5 from Humanes via Madrid Atocha to Móstoles-El Soto, operational since 1995. It is 45 km long with two LZB centres and 76 Series 446 vehicles.
- All of the Euskotren network with the exception of the Euskotren Tranbia tramways.

=== United Kingdom ===
A modified version of LZB was installed on the Chiltern Mainline as Chiltern ATP, but has since been removed.

== Non-mainline uses ==
In addition to mainline railways, versions of the LZB system are also used in suburban (S-Bahn) railways and subways.

=== Dusseldorf, Duisburg, Krefeld, Mülheim an der Ruhr ===
Tunnels in the Düsseldorf and Duisburg Stadtbahn (light rail) systems, and some tunnels of the Essen Stadtbahn around the Mülheim an der Ruhr area are equipped with LZB.

=== Vienna (Wien) ===
With the exception of line U6, the entire Vienna U-Bahn is equipped with LZB since it was first built and includes the capability of automatic driving with the operator monitoring the train.

=== Munich ===
The Munich U-Bahn was built with LZB control. During regular daytime operations the trains are automatically driven with the operator simply starting the train. Stationary signals remain dark during that time.

In the evenings from 9:00 p.m. until end of service and on Sundays the operators drive the trains manually according to the stationary signals in order to remain in practice. There are plans to automate the placement and reversal of empty trains.

The Munich S-Bahn uses LZB on its core mainline tunnel section (Stammstrecke).

=== Nuremberg ===
The Nuremberg U-Bahn U3 line uses LZB for fully automatic (driverless) operation. The system was jointly developed by Siemens and VAG Nuremberg and is the first system where driverless trains and conventional trains share a section of line. The existing, conventionally driven U2 line trains shares a segment with the automatic U3 line trains. Currently, an employee still accompanies the automatically driven trains, but later the trains will travel unaccompanied.

After several years of delays, the final three-month test run was successfully completed on 20 April 2008, and the operating licence granted on 30 April 2008. A few days later the driverless trains started operating with passengers, first on Sundays and public holidays, then weekdays at peak hours, and finally after the morning rush hour which has a tight sequence of U2 trains. The official opening ceremony for the U3 line was held on 14 June 2008 in the presence of the Bavarian Prime Minister and Federal Minister of Transport, the regular operation began with the schedule change on 15 June 2008. The Nuremberg U-bahn plans to convert U2 to automatic operation in about a year.

=== London ===
The Docklands Light Railway in east London uses the SelTrac technology which was derived from LZB to run automated trains. The trains are accompanied by an employee who closes the doors and signals the train to start, but then is mainly dedicated to customer service and ticket control. In case of failure the train can be driven manually by the on train staff.

== See also ==
- Automatic Train Protection
- Train protection system
- European Train Control System
