= San Nicasio (Madrid Metro) =

Madrid Metro station

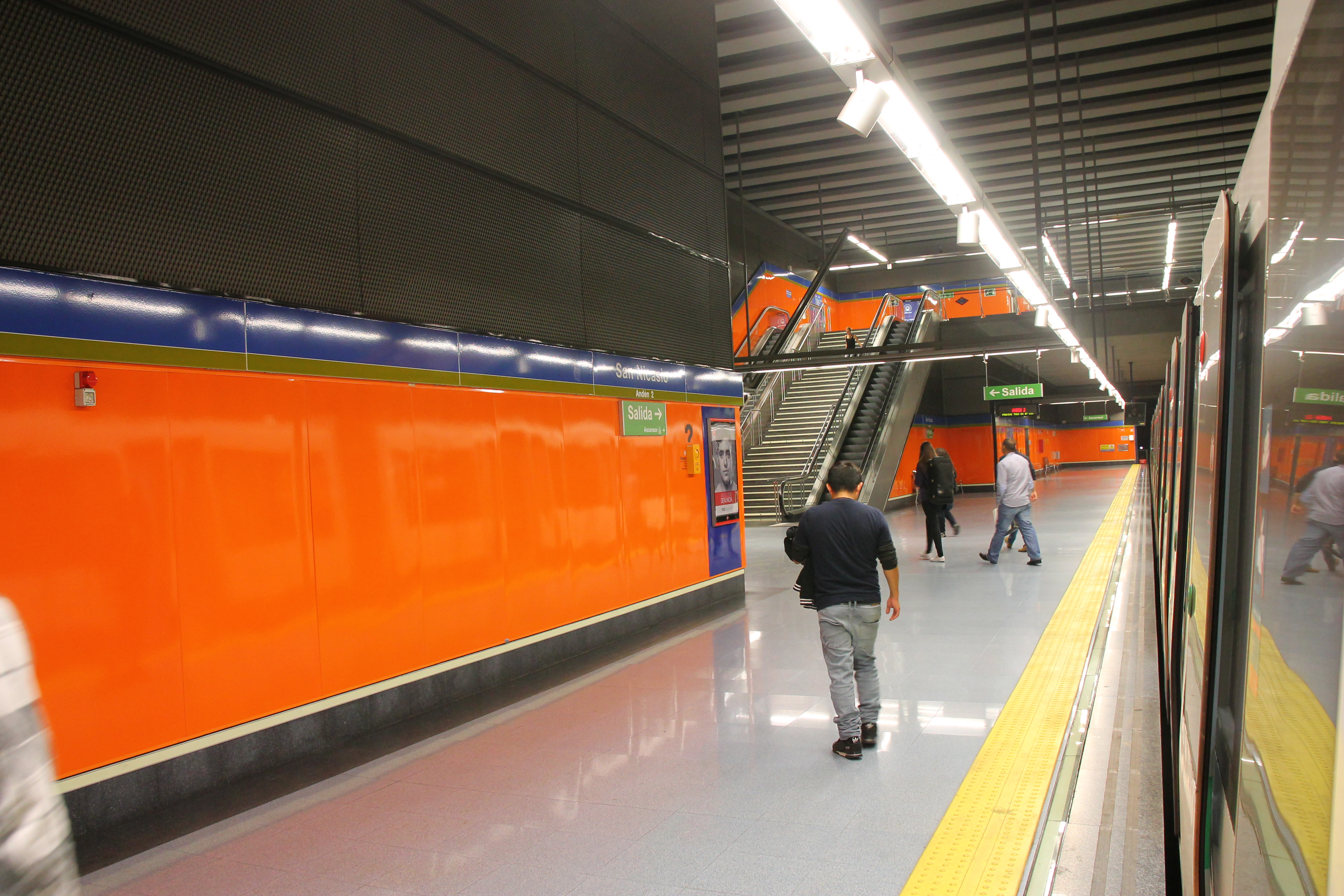
- Platform of the station

General information
- Location: Leganés, Community of Madrid; Spain
- Coordinates: 40.3361594°N 3.7758707°W
- System: Madrid Metro station
- Owner: CRTM
- Operator: CRTM

Construction
- Accessible: yes

Other information
- Fare zone: B1

History
- Opened: 11 April 2003; 23 years ago

Services
Preceding station	Madrid Metro	Following station
Leganés Central clockwise / outer	Line 12	Puerta del Sur anticlockwise / inner
Location
- Location within Madrid

San Nicasio [ˈsan niˈkasjo] is a station on Line 12 of the Madrid Metro, serving the San Nicasio barrio of Leganés, which is named for the martyr Saint Nicasius of Sicily. It is located in fare Zone B1.
