= Aller Valley Railway =

Railway line

Overview
- Native name: Allertalbahn
- Line number: 1724 Gifhorn–Celle; 1721 Celle–Wahnebergen

Service
- Route number: ex 211e Gifhorn–Celle; 210a Celle–Wahnebergen

Technical
- Track gauge: 1,435 mm

The Aller Valley Railway (German: Allertalbahn) was a railway line of regional importance in Lower Saxony. It ran along the River Aller and linked Gifhorn with Verden (Aller) via Celle, Schwarmstedt, Rethem (Aller) and Wahnebergen.

The line approached and departed from Celle station in a southerly direction, so that through trains had to reverse their direction there. As a result, the Aller Valley Railway was divided into 2 branches without any through passenger trains, which in turn meant that the eastern section from Gifhorn had route number 1724, and the western section to Wahnebergen had route number 1721. In Celle there were connexions to the East Hanoverian Railways, the Hanover–Hamburg railway, the Celle–Brunswick railway and the Kreuzbahn from Celle to Lehrte.

== History ==
The first railway from Hanover to Bremen was to run through the Aller valley based on a plan by Taylor-Vignoles. In the event, however, the railway was built in 1847 along the present-day route via Nienburg. Later plans to build a line from Magdeburg to Bremen through the Aller Valley existed from as early as 1866. However, no concrete efforts were made to build the line until the 1890s. The western section from Verden via Wahnebergen and Schwarmstedt to Celle was opened between 1903 and 1905, the eastern section from Celle to Gifhorn followed in 1913.

At Oldau station an industrial siding branched off eastwards to the Einigkeit II (Prinz Adalbert) potash works in Ovelgönne. The mine operated from 1905 to 1925.

At Südwinsen station another siding branched off west to the Steinförde potash works which operated in Wietze-Steinförde from 1907 to 1923.

In the course of building the I/XI Hambühren air force munitions depot in 1939, a siding was built to transport the raw materials and finished munitions. It left the line in a south-southeasterly direction and ran in a tight curve towards the west. This siding was removed in 1945.

During the Berlin Airlift in 1948 a branch was built at Wietzenbruch to the then Royal Air Force Celle, now the Celle Air Base.

At the end of the 1950s there were regular train crossings at Schwarmstedt station. Four steam locomotive-hauled trains passed through the station, enabling connexions to be made. That required numerous points, signals and level crossings to be worked in rapid succession. Luggage, post bags and express goods were transshipped.

Passenger services were discontinued on the western section after 25 September 1966, and goods traffic from Wietzenbruch to Schwarmstedt ceased on 31 January 1985. Goods trains continued to run from Verden as far as Rethem until 28 May 1994, and from Schwarmstedt to Gilten until 31 December 1993. Other parts of the railway line were completely lifted when it was fully closed in 1995. Between Ahlden (Aller) and Dörverden the railway embankment was turned into a cycle path which now forms part of the Aller Cycle Way.

The eastern section was closed in 1981. This line too had been largely dismantled.

The section from Celle station to the military airfield in Wietzenbruch was operated by East Hanoverian Railways from 1998 until 2005. The track from Celle station to the Airbridge Memorial in Wietzenbruch and from there with a switchback to the airfield was lifted in 2007. The tracks on the Deutsche Bahn land are still there but there is no link to the public railway network.
