= Móstoles-El Soto railway station =

Railway station in Móstoles, Spain

Coordinates: 40.3310°N 3.8822°W

Móstoles-El Soto
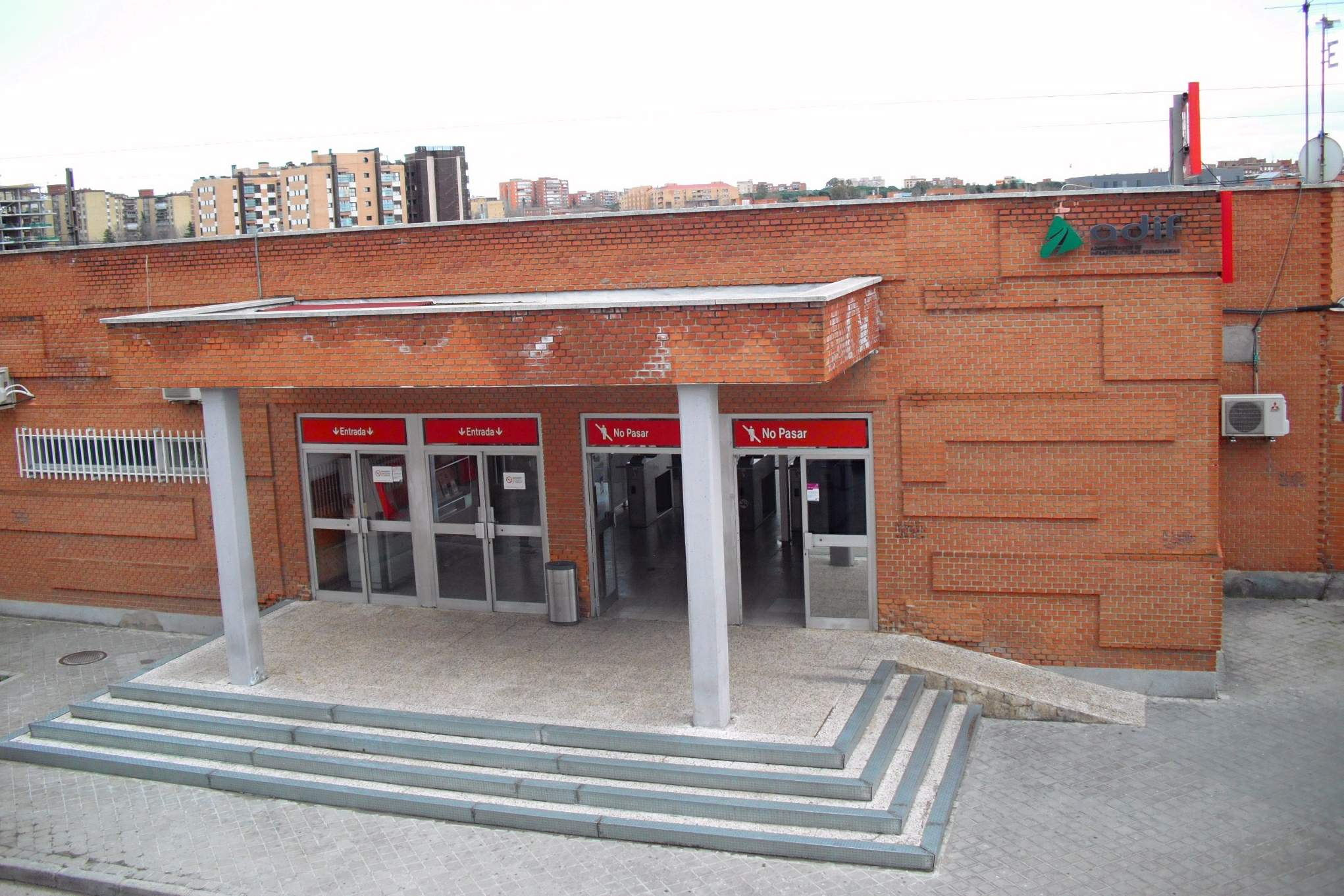

General information
- Location: Móstoles, Community of Madrid; Spain
- Owner: Adif
- Operator: Renfe Operadora
- Line: Móstoles-El Soto-Parla
- Platforms: 2 side platforms
- Tracks: 2

Construction
- Structure type: At-grade
- Accessible: Yes

History
- Opened: 29 October 1976

Services
Preceding station	Cercanías Madrid	Following station
Terminus	C-5	Móstoles towards Humanes
Location

Móstoles-El Soto, is one of two railway stations serving the town of Móstoles in the Community of Madrid, Spain. It is situated on the Madrid-Móstoles-El Soto railway and is owned by Adif. The station currently serves as the western terminus of one of Madrid's commuter lines (Cercanías Madrid line C-5).

There are plans to extend the line across the Guadarrama valley to Navalcarnero. A contract was awarded to OHL, but did not proceed due to the 2008 financial crisis.

The station which was constructed in the 1970s is in need of updating.

== History ==
At the end of the nineteenth century a narrow gauge railway was constructed between Madrid and Almorox via Mostoles. This railway closed in the 1960s, although it has been partly reopened as Cercanías Madrid line C-5 (an Iberian gauge line). Between Móstoles-El Soto railway station and Navalcarnero the track has been converted into a greenway (via verde) for cyclists and walkers.
