= Celle–Brunswick railway =

Railway line in Germany

Celle–Plockhorst–Brunswick railway
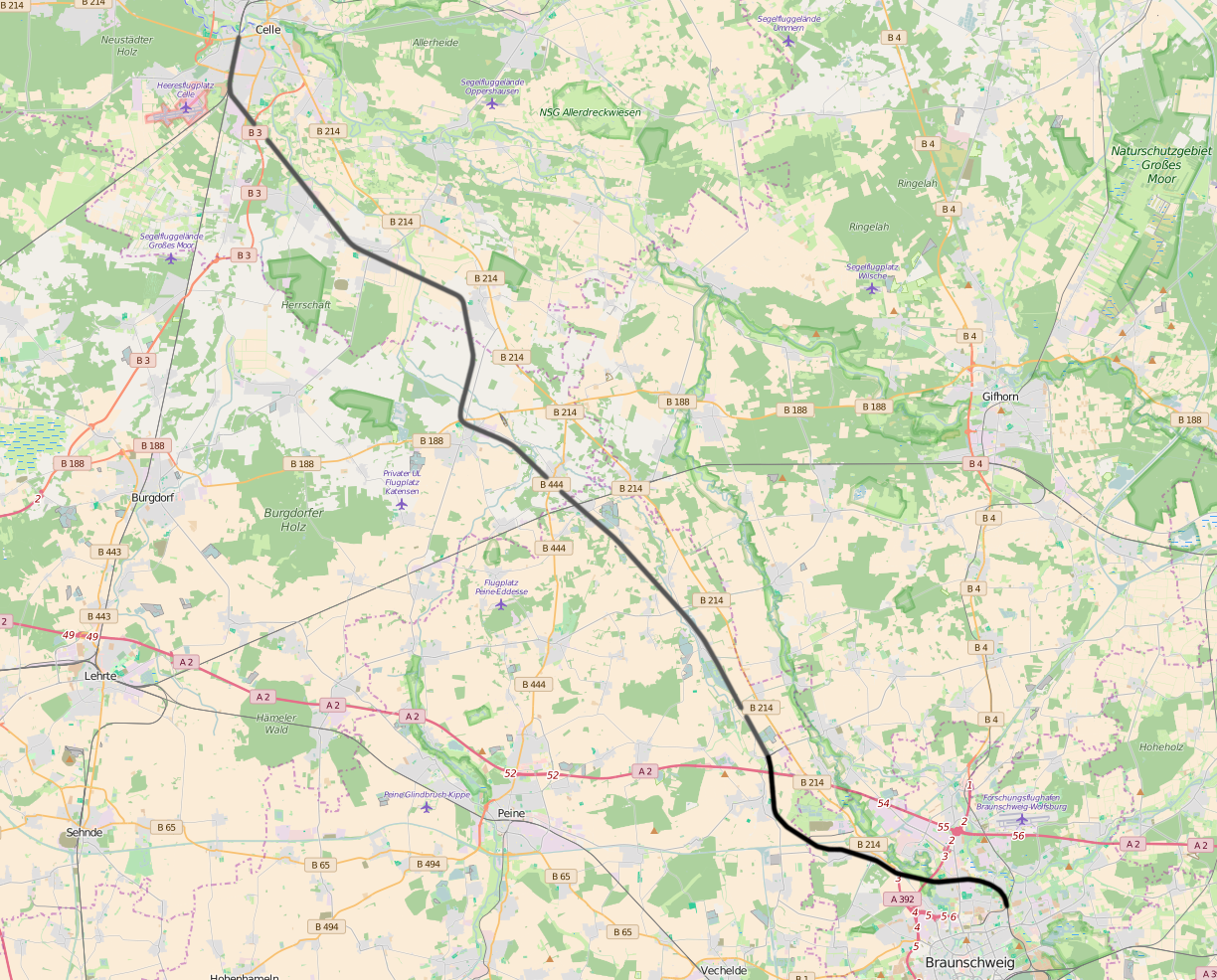

Overview
- Line number: 1722
- Locale: Lower Saxony, Germany

Service
- Route number: 211a, 211d (until 1970)

Technical
- Line length: 57.129 km (35.498 mi)
- Track gauge: 1,435 mm (4 ft 8 1/2 in) standard gauge

The Celle–Plockhorst–Brunswick railway is a partly closed railway in the German state of Lower Saxony. It is now only used for freight between Brunswick and Wendezelle.

It was opened from Celle to Uetze on 1 September 1920 and extended to Plockhorst on 3 May 1921 and to Gliesmarode on 1 March 1923.

Passenger operations between Plockhorst and Brunswick ended on 27 May 1962, between Celle and Plockhorst on 23 May 1971 and between Brunswick and Harvesse on 11 December 1994. Freight operations between Celle and Wendezelle ended in stages from 1976 to 1993. The line is largely closed and dismantled, although there have been proposals to reopen it, including reopening the line to Wipshausen as part of a proposal for a Brunswick Stadtbahn network.
