= Francis Wanley =

Francis Wanley, Doctor of Divinity (b Marske 25 April 1709; d Ripon 9 July 1791) was an eminent Anglican priest in the second half of the 18th century.

Wanley was educated at Christ's College, Cambridge. He held livings at Thirkleby, Aldborough and Stokesley. He was Dean of Ripon from 1750 to 1791.

Church of England titles
Preceded by Heneage Dering	Dean of Ripon; 1750 – 1791	Succeeded by Darley Waddilove
