= Anthony Higgin =

Anthony Higgin was Dean of Ripon from 1608 until his death in 1624.

Anthony Higgin was the son of Thomas Higgin of Manchester and his wife, Elisabeth Birch, and was probably born in the early 1550s. The family was clearly of a certain standing and his uncle was a Fellow of Corpus Christi College, Cambridge. Anthony was educated at St John's College, Cambridge, matriculating in 1568 and taking his BA in 1571-72. He remained in Cambridge after graduation, taking his M.A. in 1575 and BD in 1582. In 1583 he left Cambridge to become Rector of Kirk Deighton near Wetherby. In 1605 he was appointed Master of St. Michael’s Hospital in the village of Well, north of Ripon, and in 1608 he was made Dean of Ripon. However it seems likely that he continued to reside in Well since it is there that he made his will in 1624, shortly before his death in that same year.

By the time of his death, Higgin had assembled what was, by contemporary standards, a very substantial library. Around 1250 volumes survive as part of the Ripon Cathedral Library, but the original figure was undoubtedly significantly higher, perhaps approaching 2,000. The majority were in Latin; theological writings and the classical authors constituted the majority although medicine, geography, astronomy and law were also represented. In his will, Higgin bequeathed his books to his cousin, William Cleburne (who was a prebend of Ripon from 1616) and to his nephew Mr. Lumley, but with the condition that when they died, they should give the books to Ripon Cathedral “for a library”. In the 1980s the Ripon Cathedral Library was acquired by the Library of the University of Leeds.

One of the books owned by Higgin was a book on rhetoric by Lorenzo Gulielmo Traversagni, Epitome margaritae eloquentiae.

Church of England titles
Preceded by Moses Fowler	Dean of Ripon; 1608 – 1624	Succeeded by John Wilson
