= Chapel of St Mary Magdalen, Ripon =

Anglican church in North Yorkshire, England

St Mary Magdalen's, Ripon
- Chapel of St Mary Magdalen, Ripon
- Chapel of the Hospital of St Mary Magdalene; St Mary Magdalen (Leper) Chapel, Ripon
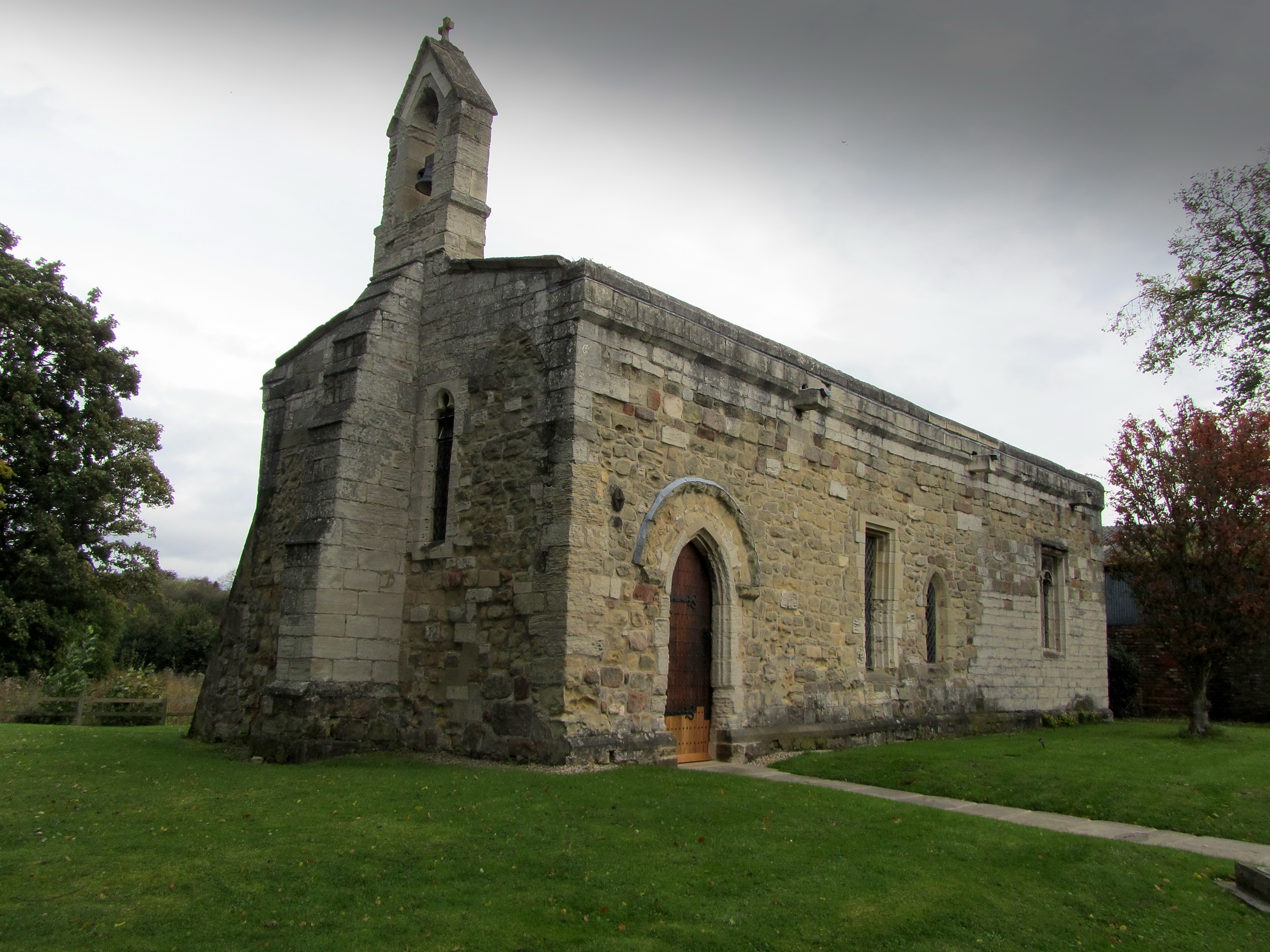
- St. Mary Magdalen Leper Chapel
- St Mary Magdalen's, Ripon
- 54.140°N 1.515°W
- OS grid reference: SE 31726 71779
- Location: Ripon, North Yorkshire
- Country: England
- Denomination: Church of England
- Website: Official website

History
- Founder: Archbishop Thurstan

Architecture
- Functional status: Active
- Architectural type: Early English; Perpendicular
- Years built: c. 1139-1140

Specifications
- Length: 48 feet 2 inches (14.68 m)
- Width: 16 feet 6 inches (5.03 m)

Administration
- Diocese: Leeds
- Archdeaconry: Ripon Cathedral
- Deanery: Ripon Cathedral
- Benefice: Ripon Cathedral
- Parish: Ripon Cathedral Parish with Littlethorpe

Clergy
- Vicar: Reverend Cliff Bowman

Listed Building – Grade I
- Designated: 27 May 1949
- Reference no.: 1150194

The Chapel of St Mary Magdalen, Ripon (sometimes listed as St Mary Magdalene, or St Mary Magdalen (Leper) Chapel, Ripon), is an active Anglican church on Magdalens Road in the city of Ripon, North Yorkshire, England. The chapel, which is dedicated to Jesus' companion Mary Magdalene, is quite close to Ripon Cathedral (which is 0.75-mile (1.21 km) to the southwest), and belongs to the cathedral's benefice, deanery and archdeaconry. The chapels' origins lie in the 12th century when it was built at the behest of Archbishop Thurstan. It was situated opposite the St Mary Magdalen Hospital grounds, becoming the chapel to the hospital and the church for lepers initially, and then later, blind priests.

Most of the present church dates to the 15th century and consists of hammer-dressed limestone. The chapel has been renovated at least four times; firstly in the 15th century, then in the 17th, then in 1917, and most recently between 1985 and 1990. The chapel is now a grade I listed structure, and is noted for being the only structure associated with Ripon's medieval hospitals that is still standing.

== History ==
Archbishop Thurstan is said to have founded the St Mary Magdalen Hospital, north-east of Ripon Cathedral, sometime between 1115 and 1139. The chapel dates from around the same time and is noted as being the only intact part of any of the medieval hospitals left in the city of Ripon. (Note: At least two other hospitals were built in the medieval period in the town; the Hospital of St Anne in Agnesgate and the Hospital of St John the Baptist in Bondgate.) Whilst no documentary evidence exists to attest to date or origin of the chapel, inquisitions held in the early 14th century had witnesses who testified that their elders and forefathers had told them Thurstan had paid for the hospital and that it should be a Leprosarium, attending to all lepers who were born in the Liberty of Ripon (omnes leprosos in Ripschire procreatos et genitos). Later, it tended to blind clergy from the same geographical area. Leper hospitals were traditionally dedicated to St Mary Magdalen, who was seen as an "outcast who was welcomed by Christ".

It is believed that almost 300 leper hospitals were built in the Middle Ages, with the chapel of St Mary Magdalen at Ripon being one of the few survivors, and so is important to archaeology. Not all leper hospitals had a resident priest, but in common with other cities and towns that had an abundant clerical community (such as at Canterbury and York), the chapel at the hospital in Ripon was afforded one.

Originally, the road that the chapel was located on was called Stammergate, but it is now called Magdalens Road. The chapel is some 0.75-mile (1.21 km) north-east of the cathedral in Ripon, close to the River Ure, and on the opposite side of the road to what was the hospital site. Its relative remoteness from the cathedral is believed by scholars to be because of its function as a leper hospital. At that time, the hospital was set in countryside and less built up than it is in modern times. When "Leprocy[sic] became less prevalent, it was converted to the use of brethren under the governance of a master".

At the west end, the chapel has a single buttress and a bellcote above the door. The west end also had another building adjoining it which was the leper-house. It is unknown when this was demolished, but the chapel now stands alone. Parts of the chapel, particularly on the westward side, are in the Early English Style, with other parts being Norman and Perpendicular. The length of the chapel is 47 feet 10 inches (14.58 m), its width as 17 feet 10 inches (5.44 m), and its height 18 feet 7 inches (5.66 m). (Note: The measurements are also given as 48 feet 2 inches (14.68 m) and its width is 16 feet 6 inches (5.03 m). However, the 1875 survey by an architect is thought to be more exacting.) The chapel has been described as an "oblong parallelogram....with no tower, aisles, porch, or vestry." The west end of the chapel is said to be the only original part of the building; the east end, with its tessellated floor, was rebuilt after a devastating raid by the Scots in 1321. The tessellated floor underneath the altar is thought to have partially come from a Roman building, as excavations of Roman-period structures in the region have revealed similar designs.

The windows on the east side are Perpendicular, with the single trefoiled window on the west side said to be Early English. Set in the middle of the north wall is a smaller window which is believed to have been a lychnoscope, which has been adapted into a normal window. (Note: Other sources state that the lychnoscope was in the south wall.) The font, of Norman origin, was returned to the chapel after being used as a water trough.

The original building was made from gritstone, but renovations, particularly those in the 15th century, have seen the use of hammer-dressed limestone. The religious authorities did not own any quarries in Ripon, but there are records of vast quantities of stone being bought from William de Kirkby in the late 14th/early 15th centuries. Whilst most of this was undoubtedly intended for the rebuilding of the cathedral, it is believed that stone purchased from de Kirkby was also used in the building of the hospital and the chapel. Detailed examinations have revealed that stone from the Quarry Moor workings, just south of Ripon, was used in the renovations.

After the dissolution, which many of the religious houses in Ripon were spared, the Canon of Ripon Cathedral became The Master of the hospital. One notable Master was Marmaduke Bradley, who was also the last abbot at Fountains Abbey. Since 1608, the priest appointed as Canon of Ripon was selected by the Archbishop of York, and since 1686, the post has been known as the Dean of Ripon Cathedral. In the 19th century, the chapel fell into disuse, even being used as a pig-sty. A second chapel was built opposite the current structure in the 1860s when the original chapel became unusable. This was paid for by one of the trustees of the hospital, the Reverend George Mason after the reorganisation of the chapel in 1864.

It is known that the rood screen was in position in 1875, but by 1902, the chapel had fallen into disuse and the screen had been removed, with the suggestion that it had been installed in the cathedral. In 1917, the chapel underwent another restoration overseen by George Bland, an architect from Harrogate.

It was renovated from 1985 onwards, and was rededicated in 1989. Whilst the chapel does not possess a burial ground, during the 1980s archaeological investigations, several skeletons were unearthed, but without burial containers or goods. It was also determined that none had shown signs of leprosy, but they were among 13th century pottery shards, so were of the era when the hospital was dealing with lepers. The investigations also revealed that the floor level was lower than the present day one and that many of the original boulders used in the chapel were replaced with magnesian limestone under a building programme conducted by Richard Hooke during the second half of the 17th century.

The current incumbent is the Reverend Cliff Bowman, but during the 1990s, the Reverend John Langdon was in charge. Since its rededication, the priest in charge at St Magdalen is also in charge at St John the Baptist (in Bondgate), another chapel in the city that formerly served a medieval hospital. Besides being used for regular worship, the chapel is occasionally used as a venue, such as in the Ripon Poetry Festival.

=== The Wooden Bell of Ripon ===
In his book, Yorkshire Oddities, the author Sabine Baring-Gould relates a tale when the chapel was not used for worship, with the residents of the almshouses having to go to the cathedral for prayers. The dean, who was fond of port, sold the bell as he was short of funds. The parishioners demanded he returned the bell, which with much anger, he did. It was later found to be a bell made of wood and painted with gun-metal; the original bell had gone to the foundry and the scrap sold to fund the drinking habits of the dean. The chapel still retains a wooden bell.

== See also ==
- Grade I listed buildings in North Yorkshire (district)
- Listed buildings in Ripon
