= John Langdon (priest) =

Deceased Anglican vicar from England

John Bonsall Langdon
- Born: 24 April 1921; Enderby, Canada
- Died: 4 November 2015 (aged 94)
- Occupation(s): Royal Marine; Vicar

The Reverend John Langdon (24 April 1921 – 4 November 2015), was a Royal Marine officer and Anglican vicar. Langdon was present at D-Day, and after the Second World War, became a vicar in the Church of England, being noted for baptising the future Dean of Ripon (John Dobson), who would later become his boss.

== Life ==
Langdon was born in a log cabin in Enderby, Canada in 1921. The family decided to move back to England for a "more comfortable experience" and Langdon was educated at Oundle School and joined the Royal Marines in 1942. On D-Day, Langdon was in charge of the landing craft from the Empire Broadsword and on the five trips the ship made in the days following the 6 June 1944, Langdon helped ferry over 5,000 troops ashore. In early July, the Empire Broadsword struck two mines and sunk from the aft. Langdon helped one wounded survivor, but returned to his cabin to retrieve his bible and some tennis rackets; he was later rescued by the Empire Battleaxe. After some rest, Langdon was sent to the Far East and assisted in the attack on Ramree Island.

After the war, Langdon attended Lincoln College in Oxford and studied PPE (Philosophy, Politics and Economics) and underwent theological instruction at Ripon Hall in Oxford.

As a curate, Langdon served in Erith then Christchurch. Thereafter, his religious career remained in the north, where he was incumbent at Swillington, before serving a lengthy spell at Wrangthorne and Woodhouse.

Although Langdon officially retired in 1992, he was installed as the chaplain of the chapels of St Mary Magdalen and St John the Baptist in Ripon. In 2014, he led the prayers at the service for the newly installed Dean of Ripon, John Dobson. Dobson was to become Langdon's boss, something that both men found funny as Langdon had baptised Dobson as a baby in his Swillington parish in the early 1960s. In June 2014, Langdon travelled to the site of his 1944 landing site (Sword Beach) in France to commemorate the 70 years since D-Day.

Just days before he died, Langdon was awarded the Legion d'Honneur by the French Government in recognition of his contribution to D-Day, and thus, the liberation of France.

== Honours ==
Ribbon	Description	Notes
	Commander of the National Order of the Legion of Honour (France)	
