= James Webber =

English churchman

James Webber (1772 – 3 September 1847) was an English churchman, Dean of Ripon from 1828 until his death.

Webber was the son of Rev. William Webber, canon of Chichester Cathedral, and his wife Anne née Smith.

He was educated at Westminster School and Christ Church, Oxford matriculating in October 1789 aged 17, graduating B.A. 1793, M.A. 1796, B.D. 1807, D.D. 1809. He became tutor and censor at Christ Church.

Webber held the following positions in the church:

- Chaplain to Lord Robert Fitzgerald's Embassy at Copenhagen, 1795
- Chaplain to the Archbishop of York, 1811
- Prebendary of York Minster, 1812
- Vicar of Sutton-on-the-Forest, Yorkshire, 1812
- Chaplain House of Commons, 1812
- Rector of Kirkham, Lancashire, 1813–1847
- Prebendary of Westminster Abbey, 1816–1847 (also Sub-Dean)
- Rector of St Margaret's, Westminster, 1828–1835
- Dean of Ripon, 1828–1847

Webber was married to Caroline Frances Fynes, daughter of Rev. Dr. Charles Fynes Clinton, whom Webber succeeded as Rector of St. Margaret's after Fynes Clinton's death in 1827.

He died on 3 September 1847, aged 75, in Ripon.

Church of England titles
Preceded by Darley Waddilove	Dean of Ripon; 1828– 1847	Succeeded by Henry Erskine
