= Higgin =

Higgin is a surname. Notable people with the surname include:

- Anthony Higgin, Anglican dean
- Howard Higgin (1891–1938), American writer and director
- Isaac Higgin (c.1789–1832), British merchant
- John Higgin, English rugby league player
- William Higgin (1793–1867), Anglican bishop

== See also ==
- Higgins (disambiguation)
