= Sydney Turner =

Sydney Turner may refer to:

- Sydney Turner (priest)
- Sydney Turner (gymnast)
