= Henry Erskine (priest) =

Henry David Erskine was the Dean of Ripon from 1847 until his death on 27 July 1859.

== Early life ==
He was the second son of Thomas Erskine, 1st Baron Erskine and his wife Frances née Moore.

== Personal life ==
He married Lady Mary Harriet Dawson, daughter of John Dawson, 1st Earl of Portarlington on 4 May 1813.

Church of England titles
Preceded by James Webber	Dean of Ripon; 1847–1859	Succeeded by Thomas Garnier
