= Epitome margaritae eloquentiae =

Copy of a Latin book on rhetoric

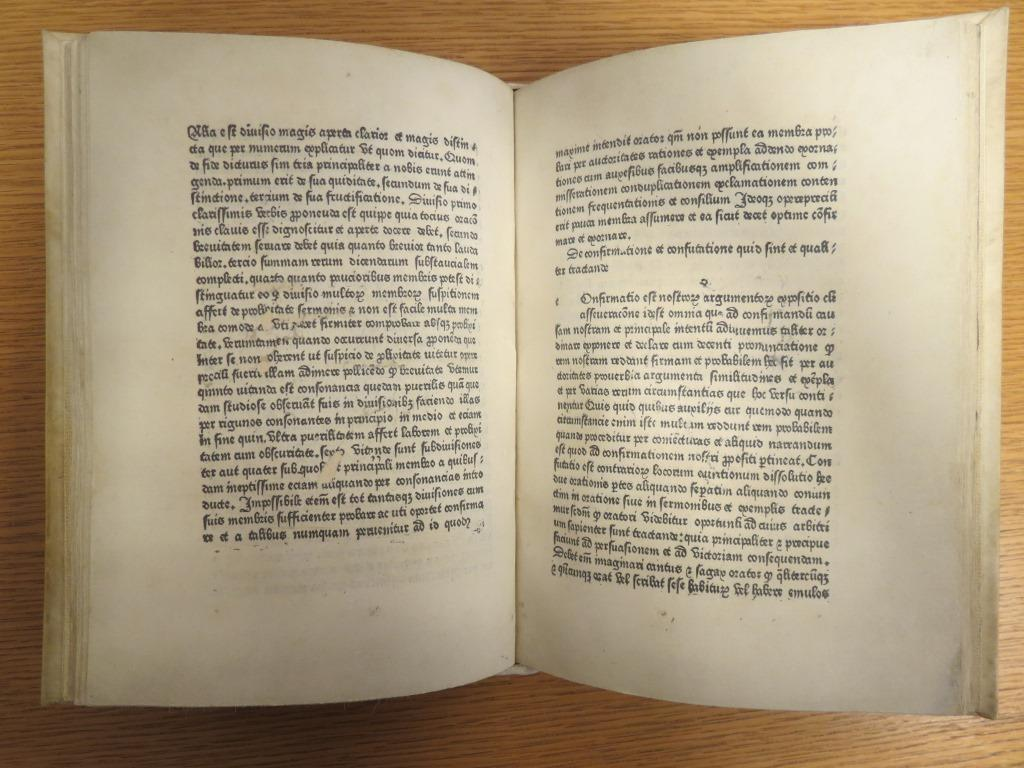
- Epitome margaritae eloquentiae by Lorenzo Guglielmo Traversagni
- Language: Latin
- Subject: rhetoric
- Genre: incunable
- Published: Westminster, London
- Publisher: William Caxton
- Publication date: c.1480
- Publication place: England
- Media type: print
- Pages: [34] leaves
- Website: https://explore.library.leeds.ac.uk/special-collections-explore/118515

The Epitome margaritae eloquentiae is a book on rhetoric written in Latin by Lorenzo Guglielmo Traversagni (c.1425-1503). The author also appears in catalogues as under the pen names Laurentius Gulielmus Traversanus and Guillermus Saphoensis the name used in this work.

Traversagni was a Franciscan friar and humanist scholar from Savona, Northern Italy. Considered to have been the first humanist professor of rhetoric at the University of Cambridge, In 1446 he attended the University of Padua to study philosophy and theology under Gaetano da Thiene and Francesco della Rovere who became Sixtus IV. Traversagni wrote the Margaritae eloquentiae as a guide to rhetoric and the art of preaching. The original book was published in 1478 under the full title of Rhetorica nova, sive, Margarita eloquentiae castigate ad eloquendum divina accommodata, (The new rhetoric, or, The pearl of purified eloquence, adapted to the expression of matters divine).

The Epitome margaritae eloquentiae is a short summary of Rhetorica nova and was finished during Traversagni's' stay in Paris in 1480. It was only ever published in England by William Caxton probably in the same year. Traversagni is known to have visited England twice in the 1470s and may have paid Caxton to print the book. The author could then sell copies to his pupils. Only one copy is known to survive, in Leeds Special Collections.

In the Epitome Traversagni argues that preaching is a rhetorical skill which aims to promote Christian virtue. He was innovative in suggesting that sacred oratory should follow teachings on classical rhetoric. At Cambridge Traversagni had lectured on Aristotle's Ethics and also the Rhetorica ad Herennium attributed to Cicero. He uses these philosophers' concepts of demonstrative logic to prove his point.

== Physical Description ==
The copy of the Epitome in Leeds Special Collections is printed on Italian paper of the kind made in Fabriano and Genoa in the medieval period and has watermarks of the scissors type. The binding is 20th century limp vellum with a smooth spine.

The Epitome has no title page. The 34 pages are printed in Caxton's type 2* with 29 long lines to a full page, probably in 1480 or 1481. The signatures are [a^{6} b^{4} c^{6} d^{6} e^{8} f^{4}]. There are no printed signatures, catchwords or pagination. There are some unusual typographical features including the abbreviation of some common Latin words or word-endings, for example, '-t' with a feathered crossbar for '-tur' (lines 3 and 29) and an elongated '9' for '-us' (line 4 and others).

== Provenance ==
The Epitome was formerly part of a volume which belonged to Anthony Higgin who was Dean of Ripon from 1608 to 1624. The rest of the volume is in the British Library. It was removed from the volume and repaired and rebound by staff at the British Museum. The Epitome was bought for the Brotherton Collection on 21 May 1960.

== Feature ==
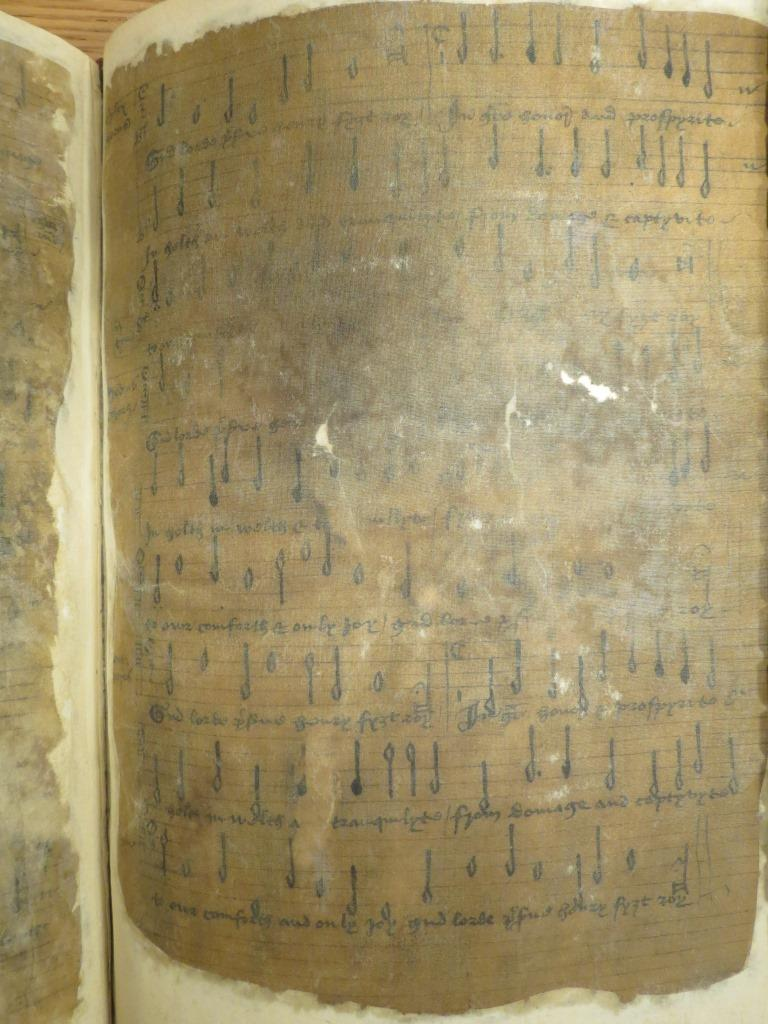
The second page of a ballad relating to Henry Fitzroy Duke of Richmond and Somerset (1519–1536) written on a sheet inserted at the back of the volume

There is a handwritten annotation on the verso of the final leaf of the book and the recto of an inserted leaf. This is in black ink and comprises a ballad with text and music A lytyll ballet mayde of ye yong dukes grace about Henry FitzRoy, Duke of Richmond and Somerset.
