= Keith Jukes =

The Very Reverend Keith Jukes
- Dean of Ripon
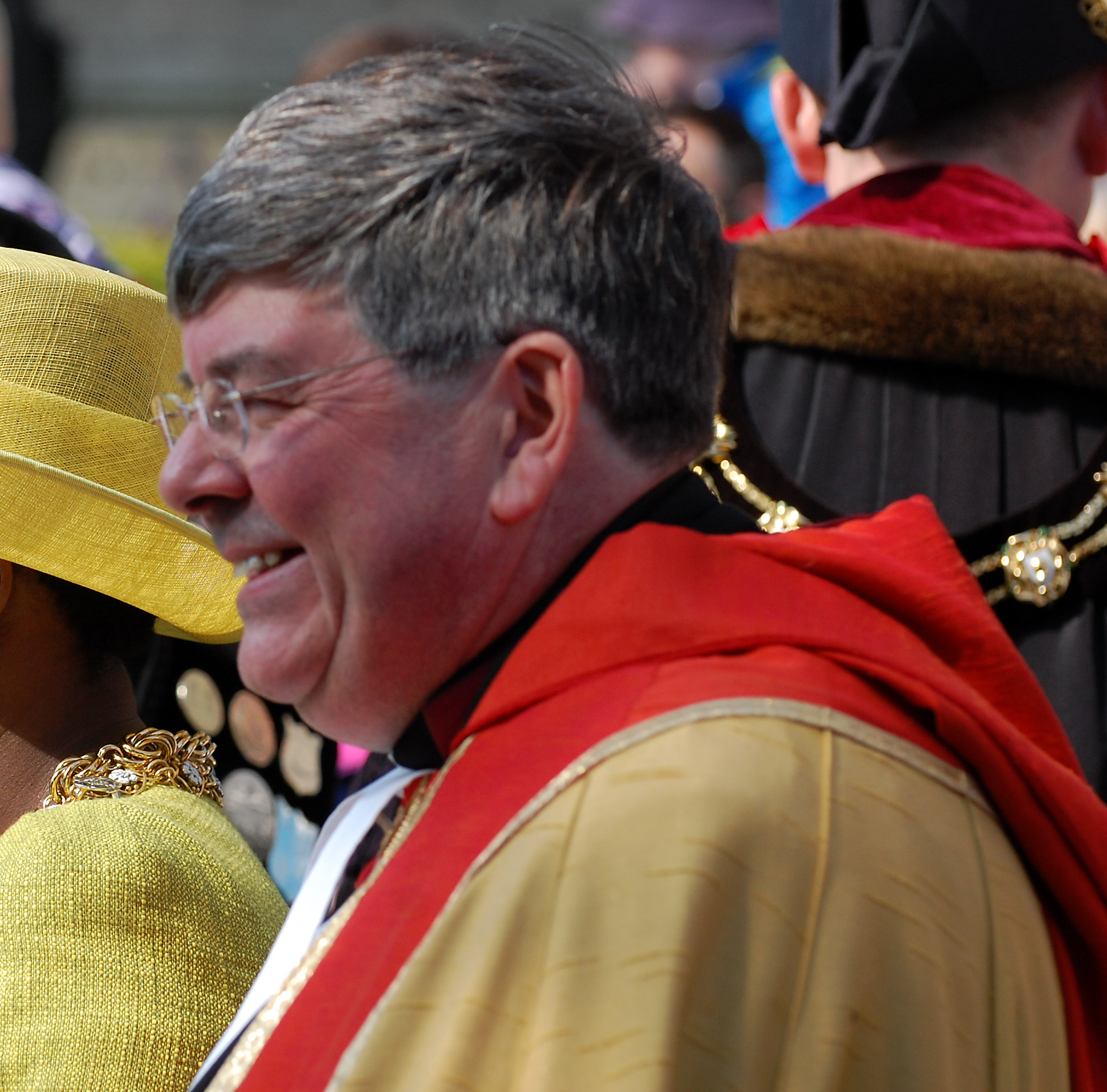
- Jukes in 2012
- Church: Church of England
- Province: Province of York
- Diocese: Diocese of Ripon
- In office: 2007–2013
- Predecessor: John Methuen
- Successor: John Dobson

Orders
- Ordination: 1978 (Deacon); 30 June 1979 (Priest)

Personal details
- Born: Keith Michael Jukes; 18 February 1954
- Died: 21 May 2013 (aged 59) Harrogate, North Yorkshire, England
- Education: University of Leeds

Keith Michael Jukes (18 February 1954 – 21 May 2013) was a senior Church of England priest. From 2007 to 2013, he was the dean of Ripon.

== Early life and education ==
Jukes was born on 18 February 1954. He studied theology at the University of Leeds and graduated with a Bachelor of Arts (BA) degree in 1976. From 1977 to 1978, he spent a year at Lincoln Theological College, an Anglican theological college, to prepare for ordained ministry.

== Ordained ministry ==
Jukes was ordained in the Church of England as a deacon in 1978 and as a priest on 30 June 1979. His first two postings were as a curate in the Diocese of Lichfield; the first from 1978 to 1981 and the second from 1981 to 1983. From 1983 to 1990, he was Curate-in-Charge of St Martin's Church, Stonydelph, Tamworth, Staffordshire: it is a jointly Anglican and Methodist church. In 1990, a team ministry was created joining St Martin's and two other churches. From 1990 to 1991, he served as Team Rector of the new parish and Rural Dean of Tamworth. Then, from 1991 to 1997, he served as Vicar of St Saviours Church, Hatherton, Staffordshire. In 1996, he was appointed a Prebendary of Lichfield Cathedral

In 1997, he moved to the Diocese of York and was appointed Priest-in-Charge of Selby Abbey. He made Vicar of the Abbey in 1999. In March 2007, he moved to the Diocese of Ripon and was appointed Dean of Ripon Cathedral. The previous Dean had left following allegations that his conduct was "unbecoming [of] the office of a clerk in Holy Orders".

He fell within the Liberal Catholic tradition of the Church of England, and was a firm supporter of women priests.

== Death ==
On 21 May 2013, Jukes died from stomach cancer at Harrogate District Hospital, Harrogate, North Yorkshire. He had announced his illness on 19 May, the previous Sunday. On 31 May, his funeral was held at Ripon Cathedral and led by John Packer, the then Bishop of Ripon and Leeds.

== Personal life ==
In 1978, Jukes married Susanne (née Weatherhogg). Together they had two children: Laura and Matthew.

Church of England titles
Preceded by John Methuen	Dean of Ripon; 2007–2013	Succeeded by John Dobson
