= Christopher Campling =

British Anglican priest (1925–2020)

The Very Reverend Christopher Campling
- Dean of Ripon
- Church: Church of England
- Diocese: Diocese of Ripon
- In office: 1984 – 1995
- Predecessor: Edwin Le Grice
- Successor: John Methuen
- Other post: Archdeacon of Dudley (1976–1984)

Orders
- Ordination: 1952

Personal details
- Born: Christopher Russell Campling; 4 July 1925
- Died: 9 December 2020 (aged 95)
- Denomination: Anglicism
- Education: Lancing College; St Edmund Hall, Oxford

Christopher Russell Campling (4 July 1925 – 9 December 2020) was a British Anglican priest who was the Dean of Ripon.

== Early life and education ==
Campling was born on 4 July 1925 and educated at Lancing College and St Edmund Hall, Oxford.

== Ordained ministry ==
Ordained in 1952 he began his career with a curacy in Basingstoke after which he was a Minor Canon at Ely Cathedral. He was then appointed Chaplain of his old school. Later Vicar then Rural Dean of Pershore, his next appointment was as Archdeacon of Dudley in 1975 — a post he held jointly with his role as director of education for the Anglican Diocese of Worcester and priest-in-charge of St Augustine's Church, Dodderhill, Droitwich. Then, in 1984, he was appointed Dean of Ripon. After 11 years as head of Ripon Cathedral, he retired from full-time ministry.

Campling belonged to the liberal wing of the Church of England. He was a supporter of ecumenism, the ordination of women, the remarriage of divorcees in church.

An eminent author, he retired to Worthing where he wrote his memoir, I Was Glad. He continued to preach and lecture occasionally in retirement.

He died on 9 December 2020 at the age of 95.

Church of England titles
Preceded by Edwin Le Grice	Dean of Ripon; 1984–1995	Succeeded by John Methuen
