= John Methuen (priest) =

English priest

Rev. John Methuen
- Methuen (left) pictured with activist Viraj Mendis in 1986
- Born: John Alan Robert Methuen; August 14, 1947
- Died: July 18, 2010 (aged 62)
- Occupation: Anglican priest
- Organization: Church of England
- Known for: 1986 Viraj Mendis sanctuary; Dean of Ripon (1995-2005)

John Alan Robert Methuen (14 August 1947 – 18 July 2010) was an Anglican priest. He was known for his involvement in sheltering the Sri Lankan activist Viraj Mendis in the 1980s. In his later career, he served as the as Dean of Ripon Cathedral.

== Early life ==
Methuen was born on 14 August 1947 and educated at Eton College, St John's School, Leatherhead and Brasenose College, Oxford.

== Religious career ==
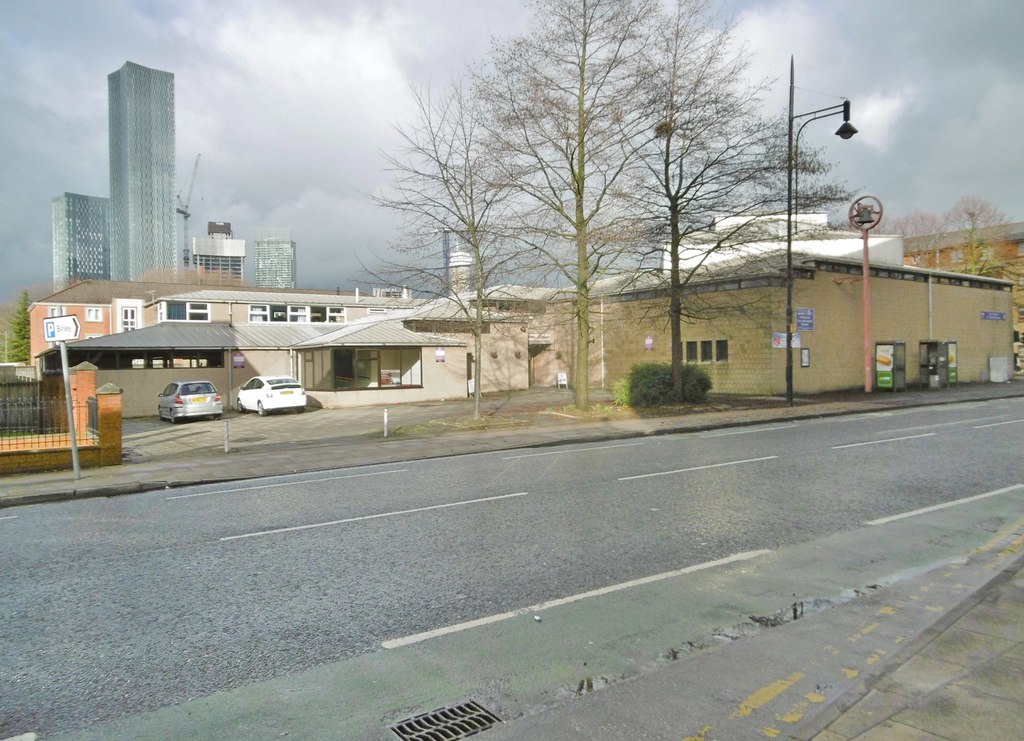
Church of the Ascension, Hulme in Manchester

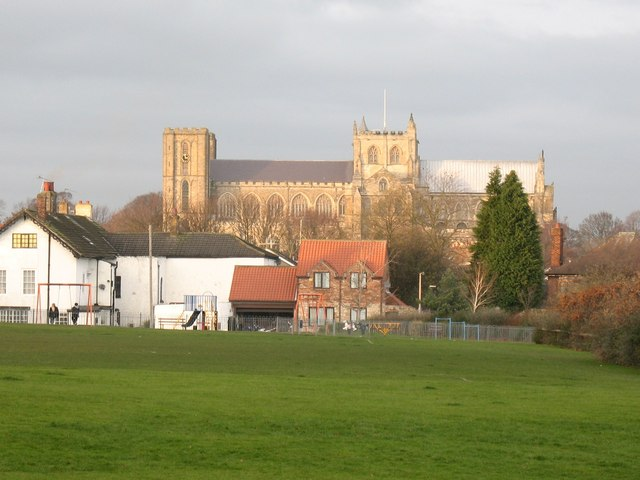
Ripon Cathedral

He was ordained in 1972 and was a curate at Fenny Stratford, after which he was appointed chaplain of Eton College. He was subsequently vicar of St Mark's Reading, and then became rector of The Church of the Ascension in Hulme, Manchester. While in Hulme, he rose to prominence in the media when he sheltered Sri Lankan asylum seeker Viraj Mendis in the church for over two years (December 1986 to January 1989).

His next appointment was as Dean of Ripon in 1995. A divisive figure, he was facing 21 charges of misconduct before a consistory court, but resigned in 2005 before the cases came to court.

== Later life ==
After Ripon, he retired to London where he lectured and attended seminars and tours.

== Death ==
Mehuen died in London in 2010. His funeral service was held at Saint Bartholomew the Great, Smithfield, London. Viraj Mendis, who had been supported by Methuen in the 1980s, was denied a visa by the Home Office to enter to the UK in order to attend Methuen's funeral.

A memorial service was subsequently held for Methuen at Ripon Cathedral in February 2011.

Church of England titles
Preceded by Christopher Campling	Dean of Ripon; 1995–2005	Succeeded by Keith Jukes
