= Frederick Edwin (disambiguation) =

Frederick Edwin may refer to:

- Frederick Edwin (born 1980), Indonesian politician
- Frederick Edwin Smith, 1st Earl of Birkenhead (1872–1930), British politician
- Frederick Edwin Le Grice (1911–1992), English priest
- Frederic Edwin Church (1826–1900), American painter
