= Christopher Wyvill =

Christopher Wyvill may refer to:

- Christopher Wyvill (reformer) (1740–1822), English cleric, landowner and political reformer
- Christopher Wyvill (Royal Navy officer) (1792–1863), Royal Navy admiral
- Christopher Wyvill (priest) (dies 1710), Anglican priest
- Sir Christopher Wyvill, 3rd Baronet (1614–1681), English politician
