= William Fremantle (Dean of Ripon, died 1895) =

Anglican priest

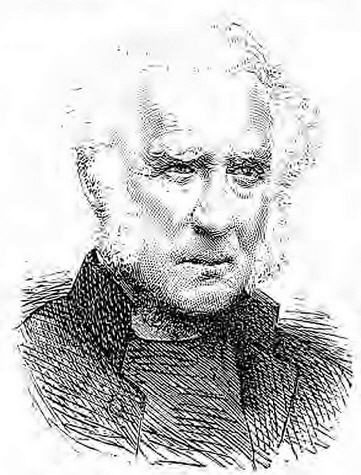

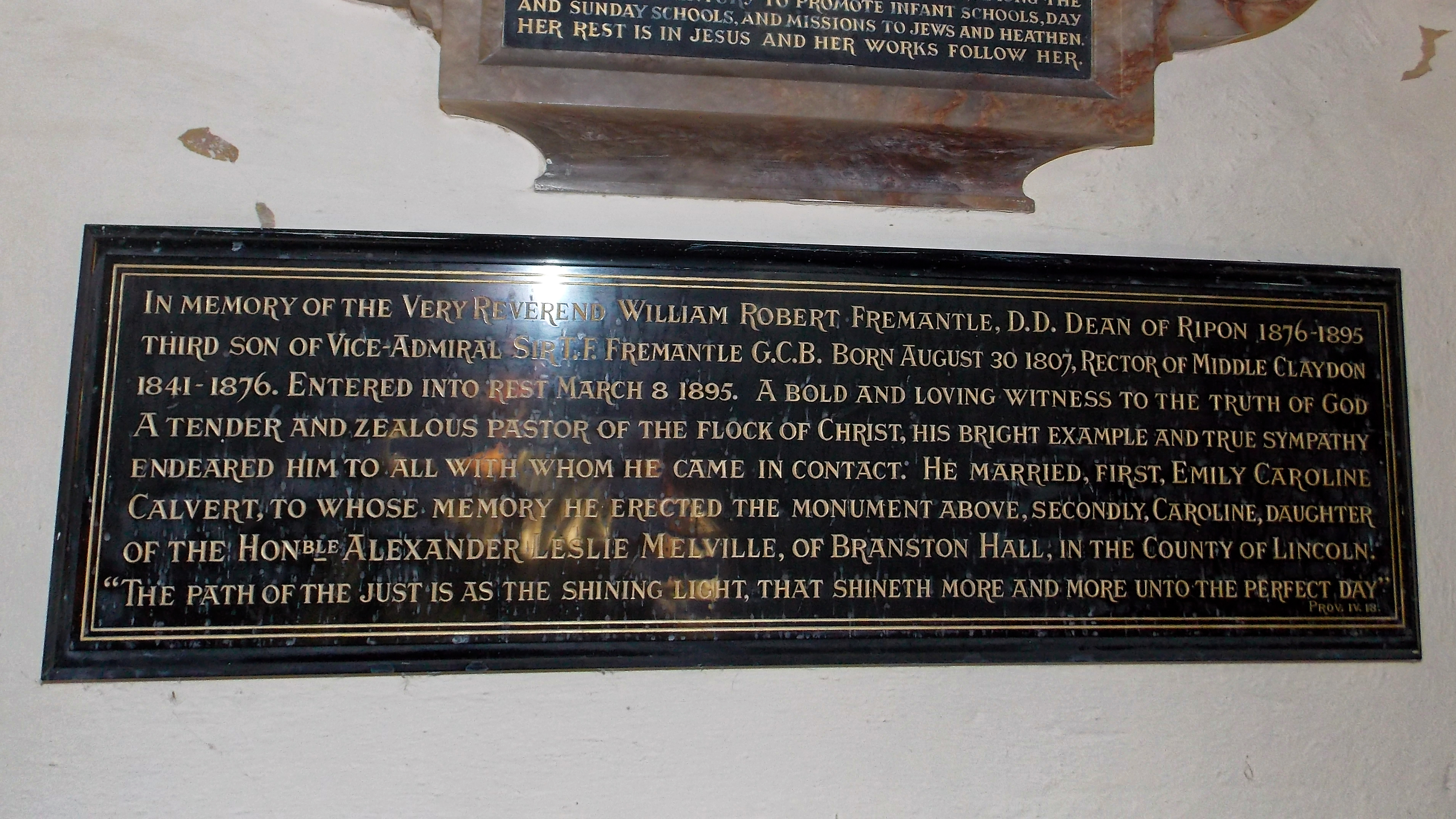

William Robert Fremantle (30 August 1807 – 8 March 1895) was a British clergyman who was the Dean of Ripon from 1876 until his death.

== Biography ==
He was educated at Westminster and Christ Church, Oxford. In 1828 he became a Fellow of Magdalen College, Oxford, and Curate of Swanbourne. He held incumbencies in Pitchcott and Middle Claydon before his elevation to the Deanery.

He was the brother of Thomas Fremantle, 1st Baron Cottesloe, and therefore uncle of the Hon William Fremantle, who succeeded Fremantle as Dean of Ripon.

Church of England titles
Preceded by Sydney Turner	Dean of Ripon; 1876 – 1895	Succeeded by William Fremantle
