= Sydney Turner (priest) =

Anglican clergyman

Sydney Turner (2 April 1814 – 26 June 1879) was an Anglican clergyman, Dean of Ripon from December 1875 until March 1876. He was born in 1814, the youngest son of the historian Sharon Turner, and educated at Trinity College, Cambridge. He was ordained in 1837 and became a curate at Christ Church, Southwark. He was for many years an Inspector of Industrial and Reformatory Schools. He was Chaplain to the Philanthropic Society for the reformation of juvenile offenders from 1842 to 1857. An Inspector of prisons from 1858 to 1867, in 1858 he delivered a sermon to open the meeting of the National Association for the Promotion of Social Science. He was Rector of Hempsted from 1867 to 1875, and again (after his brief spell as Dean of Ripon) from 1876 until his death

He died on 26 June 1879.

== Works ==
- Report on the system and arrangements of "La colonie agricole" at Mettray, 1846
- Reformatory Schools. A Letter to C. B. Adderley, Esq., M.P, 1848
- Pray for us : a farewell sermon, preached in the Philanthropic Society's Chapel, St. George's Fields, on Sunday, April 16, 1849, 1849
- First report of the inspector appointed, under the provisions of the Act 5 & 6 Will.IV.c.38, to visit the different reformatory schools of Great Britain, 1858

Church of England titles
Preceded by Hugh Boyd M‘Neile	Dean of Ripon; 1875–1876	Succeeded by William Robert Fremantle
