= Thomas Dod =

Anglican priest

Thomas Dod D.D. (4 December 1576, Shocklach – 10 February 1648, Malpas) was an eminent Anglican priest in the first half of the 17th century.

Dod was educated at Jesus College, Cambridge then migrated to Oxford in 1600. He held livings at Eastwell, Astbury and Malpas. He was Archdeacon of Richmond from 1607, and Dean of Ripon from 1635, holding both posts until his death.
