= John Neile =

John Neile D.D. (9 December 1609 in Westminster – 14 April 1675 in Ripon) was an eminent Anglican priest in the second half of the 17th century.

Neile was educated at Pembroke College, Cambridge. Neile was ordained in 1632 and became Chaplain to his uncle Richard Neile, Archbishop of York. He held livings at Beeford, Northallerton and Kirby Sigston. He was Archdeacon of Cleveland from 1638; and Dean of Ripon holding both posts until his death.
