= Llewelyn Hughes =

Frederick Llewelyn Hughes CB CBE MC TD KHC (12 July 1894 – 4 June 1967) was an Anglican priest and British Army chaplain. He served as Chaplain-General from 1944 to 1951 and Dean of Ripon from 1951 to 1967.

== Early life ==
Hughes was born on 12 July 1894 and educated at Christ's Hospital and Jesus College, Oxford. He matriculated at Oxford in 1913 as an exhibitioner, and was highly regarded as a speaker in the college's Junior Common Room and as a rugby player. In due course, he became President of the JCR and captain of rugby.

== Military service ==
Hughes served in the British Army during World War I. He was commissioned into the King's Regiment (Liverpool) on 24 October 1914 as a second lieutenant (on probation). On 26 May 1916 the then lieutenant was appointed an Adjutant. He was awarded the Military Cross in 1917. As a captain, he was appointed General Staff Officer (Grade 3) on 28 March 1918. He served as a staff captain from 20 December 1918 to 16 May 1919. He relinquished his commission on 1 April 1920 and retained the rank of captain.

== Religious career ==
Hughes was ordained in 1922 and began his career with a curacy at Holy Trinity, Brompton. Subsequently vicar of St Stephen's, Paddington then vicar of Mansfield.

On 18 February 1935, he relinquished his rank of captain to join the Royal Army Chaplains' Department as a Chaplain to the Forces (4th Class). He was promoted to Chaplain to the Forces (3rd Class) on 1 April 1939.

With the outbreak of World War II, Hughes saw active service. He was posted to the Middle East during the first year of the war. By October 1943, he was Chaplain to the Forces (2nd Class), and temporary Chaplain to the Forces (1st Class). He rose to the rank of Archdeacon of the Forces, the most senior Church of England chaplain. Montgomery described him as "the ideal military padre". He was appointed Chaplain-General to the Forces in 1944. He relinquished the position on 6 November 1951.

In November 1945, he was appointed to the Royal Household as a chaplain. He was appointed Dean of Ripon in August 1951.

He died on 4 June 1967.

== Honours and decorations ==
On 1 April 1941, Hughes was mentioned in dispatches "for distinguished services in the Middle East during the period August, 1939, to November, 1940". He was appointed a Commander of the Order of the British Empire (CBE) on 14 October 1943 "in recognition of gallant and distinguished services in the Middle East". He was made an Honorary Chaplain to King George VI (KHC) in 1944. He was mentioned in dispatches on 22 March 1945 "in recognition of gallant and distinguished services in North West Europe". He was awarded the Efficiency Decoration (TD) on 10 October 1947, for which he was awarded three clasps on 16 February 1951. He was appointed a Companion of the Order of the Bath (CB) on 9 June 1949 as part of that year's King's Birthday Honours. He was made an Officer of the Venerable Order of Saint John (OStJ) in January 1962.

Church of England titles
Preceded by Godwin Birchenough	Dean of Ripon; 1951 – 1967	Succeeded by Frederick Edwin Le Grice
