= Viraj Mendis =

Sri Lankan national who claimed sanctuary in an English church

- Mendis in 1986
- Born: Sri Lanka
- Died: 16 August 2024 (Age 63); Bremen, Germany
- Known for: Human rights activist, Viraj Mendis Defence Campaign
- Political party: Revolutionary Communist Group (RCG)

Viraj Mendis (died 16 August 2024) was a Sri Lankan Communist and activist who claimed the right of sanctuary at the Church of the Ascension in Hulme, Manchester, England during the 1980s. He became involved with the Revolutionary Communist Group (RCG) in 1980, joining the organisation's solidarity campaigns around Irish liberation, anti-racism and deportations.

== Sanctuary in the Church of the Ascension ==
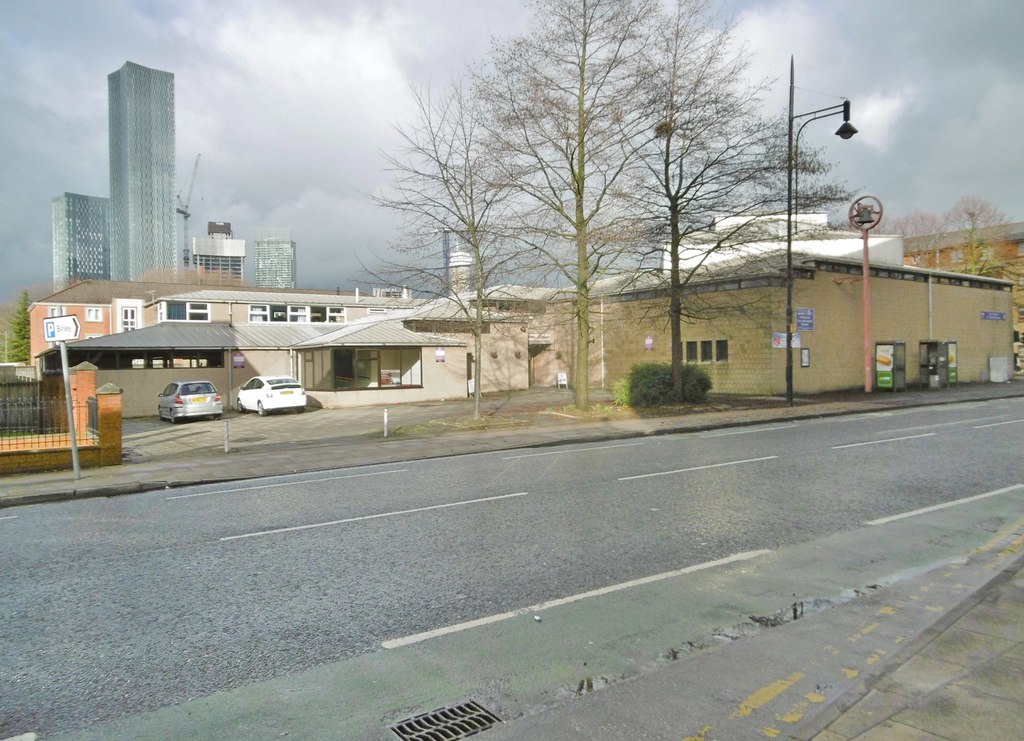
Church of the Ascension, Hulme in Manchester

Mendis had arrived in Britain on October 1973, on a twelve-month student visa. He was accused of overstaying his visa in May 1984, the Home Office beginning deportation procedures against him. The Viraj Mendes Defence Campaign (VMDC) was established by the RCG, protesting his deportation, on the grounds that he would be subject to persecution and possible death by the Sri Lankan government, due to his open support for the Tamil liberation struggle in the country.

Following a march to protest against his deportation on 20 December 1986 he ran into the Church of the Ascension and claimed the right of sanctuary. He stayed in the Anglican church building for the next two years with the help of the rector John Methuen. The church became the focus of the VMDC against his deportation. In late 1988 his supporters were invited to address an assembly at Burnage High School where pupils were encouraged to enlist the help of parents to his cause. One parent took exception to this and contacted the Manchester Evening News, and the story was then picked up on by The Daily Telegraph; shortly afterwards Mendis was removed: On 18 January 1989 police raided the church and arrested Mendis, which led to a large demonstration and questions in the House of Commons.

He was deported back to Sri Lanka and his fears did not materialize. Mendis claimed his case had received so much publicity that the Sri Lankan government did not dare to harm him. Eight British activists accompanied him to Sri Lanka to offer protection.

== Later activism ==
He was later granted asylum in Germany and became chairperson of the International Human Rights Association in Bremen (German: Internationaler Menschenrechtsverein Bremen) and worked defending refugees facing deportation, and on Tamil liberation.

While in Sri Lanka, Mendis married his partner Karen Roberts. He was able to return to the UK several times. However, in 2010 he was refused permission to enter the country to attend the funeral service of John Methuen.

In 2018 Mendis' organisation concluded a successful campaign to defend 13 activists, 12 of them Tamil, against charges of "fraud, false documentation, money laundering and extortion". In June of that year, the 13 were found not guilty by the Swiss Federal Criminal Court. The Sri Lankan Government subsequently listed him as a terrorist.

He died in a German hospital on 16 August 2024.

== Popular culture ==
Mendis’ story is the subject of a six-part podcast series titled Sanctuary on BBC Sounds.

The podcast is part of the BBC’s In Detail series, which revisits significant real-life events and personal stories. It provides a platform for first-hand testimony and explores the wider social, political and human context surrounding Mendis’ decision to seek sanctuary.
