= Edwin Le Grice =

English Anglican priest (1911-1992)

Frederick Edwin Le Grice (1911–1992) was an English Anglican priest in the latter part of the 20th century.

He was born on 14 December 1911 at Harleston, Norfolk and educated at Queens' College, Cambridge. Ordained in 1936 he began his career with curacies in Leeds and Paignton. Subsequently, Vicar of Totteridge he was then appointed a Canon Residentiary of St Albans Cathedral, a post he held until his appointment as Dean of Ripon in 1968. He retired in 1984 after 16 years in post and died on 25 June 1992 at Ripon.

A large stained glass window in the Cathedral is dedicated to Edwin Le Grice. It features medieval stained glass found when the Cathedral was being restored and a line of one of his poems, "Surround us with your symphony of praise, God's messengers of light.'

Church of England titles
Preceded by Frederick Llewelyn Hughes	Dean of Ripon; 1968 – 1984	Succeeded by Christopher Russell Campling
