= Isaac Higgin =

London merchant and politician in Jamaica

Isaac Higgin (c.1789-1832) was a London merchant, planter and slave owner in Jamaica. He was elected to the House of Assembly of Jamaica in 1820.
