= Moses Fowler =

Dean of Ripon

Moses Fowler was Dean of Ripon from 1604 until his death in March 1608.

From Kent, Fowler was educated at Corpus Christi College, Cambridge. He held livings at Aylsham, Brandesburton and Sigglesthorne.
