= Dean of Ripon =

Head of the chapter at Ripon Cathedral, England

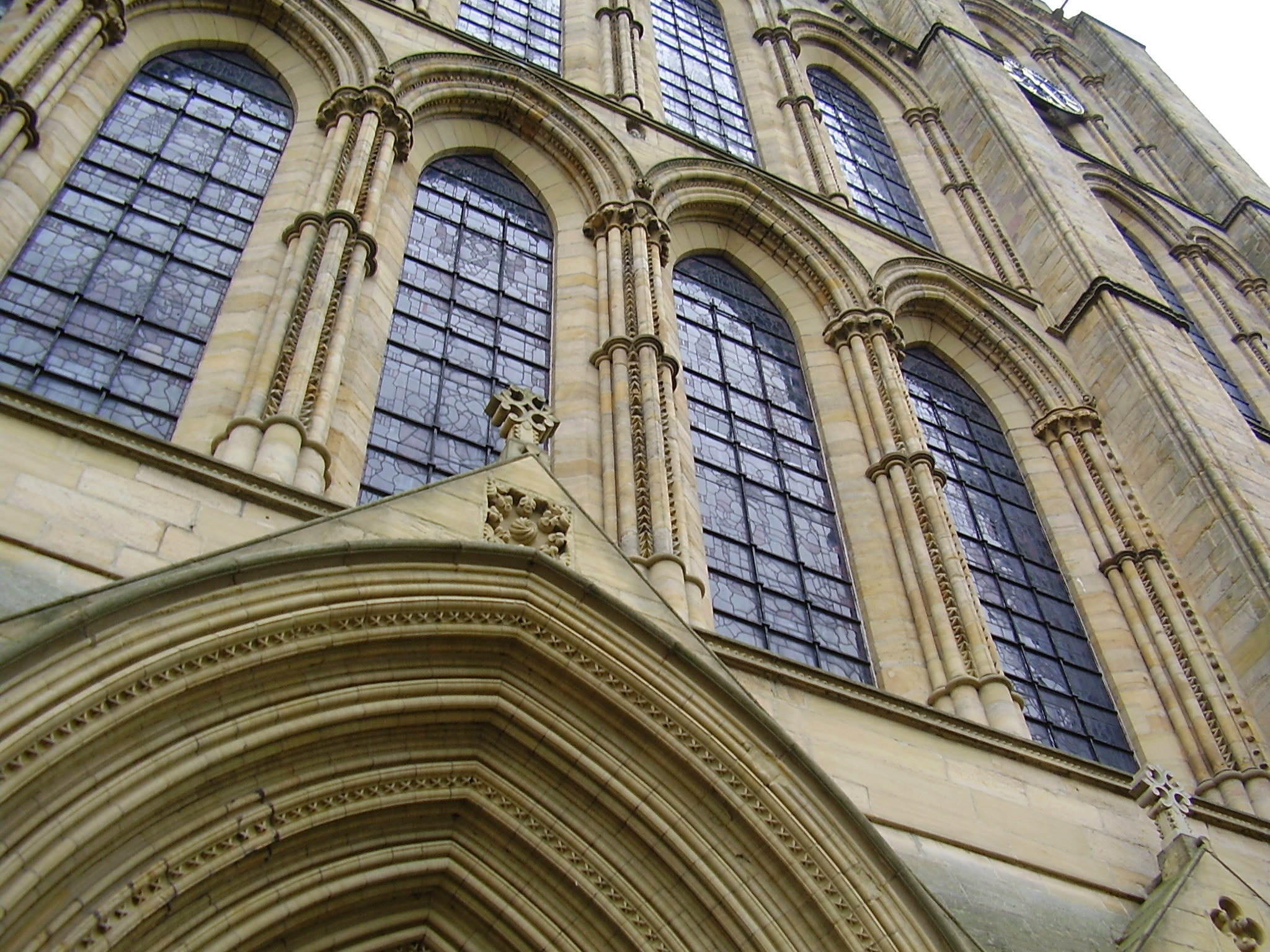
The western façade of Ripon Cathedral

The Dean of Ripon is a senior cleric in the Church of England Diocese of Leeds. The dean is the head of the chapter at Ripon Cathedral – his predecessors were deans of the same church when it was previously the cathedral of the Diocese of Ripon and a minster in the diocese of York.

== List of deans ==
=== Deans of Ripon Minster ===
- 1604–1608 Moses Fowler
- 1608–1624 Anthony Higgin
- 1624–1634 John Wilson
- 1635–1645 Thomas Dod
- 1646–1662 Vacancy – Commonwealth of England, Scotland and Ireland
- 1663–1672 John Wilkins
- 1674–1675 John Neile
- 1675–1675 Thomas Tully
- 1675–1686 Thomas Cartwright
- 1686–1710 Christopher Wyvill
- 1710–1750 Heneage Dering
- 1750–1791 Francis Wanley
- 1791–1828 Darley Waddilove
- 1828–1836 James Webber

=== Deans of Ripon Cathedral ===
- 1836–1847 James Webber
- 1847–1859 Hon Henry Erskine (son of Lord Erskine)
- 1859–1860 Thomas Garnier
- 1860–1868 William Goode
- 1868–1876 Hugh Boyd M‘Neile
- 1876–1876 Sydney Turner
- 1876–1895 William Fremantle
- 1895–1914 Hon William Fremantle (nephew of the above)
- 1915–1940 Mansfield Owen
- 1941–1951 Godwin Birchenough
- 1951–1967 Llewelyn Hughes
- 1968–1984 Edwin Le Grice
- 1984–1995 Christopher Campling
- 1995–2005 John Methuen
- 2007–2013 Keith Jukes
- 2014–present John Dobson

== Sources ==
- British History Online – Fasti Ecclesiae Anglicanae 1541–1857 – Deans of Ripon (Cathedral)
- Memorials of the Church of SS. Peter and Wilfrid volume II. Durham: Surtees Society. 1886. OCLC 985726699.
