= John Dobson (priest) =

British Anglican priest and Dean of Ripon

The Very Reverend John Dobson DL
- Dean of Ripon
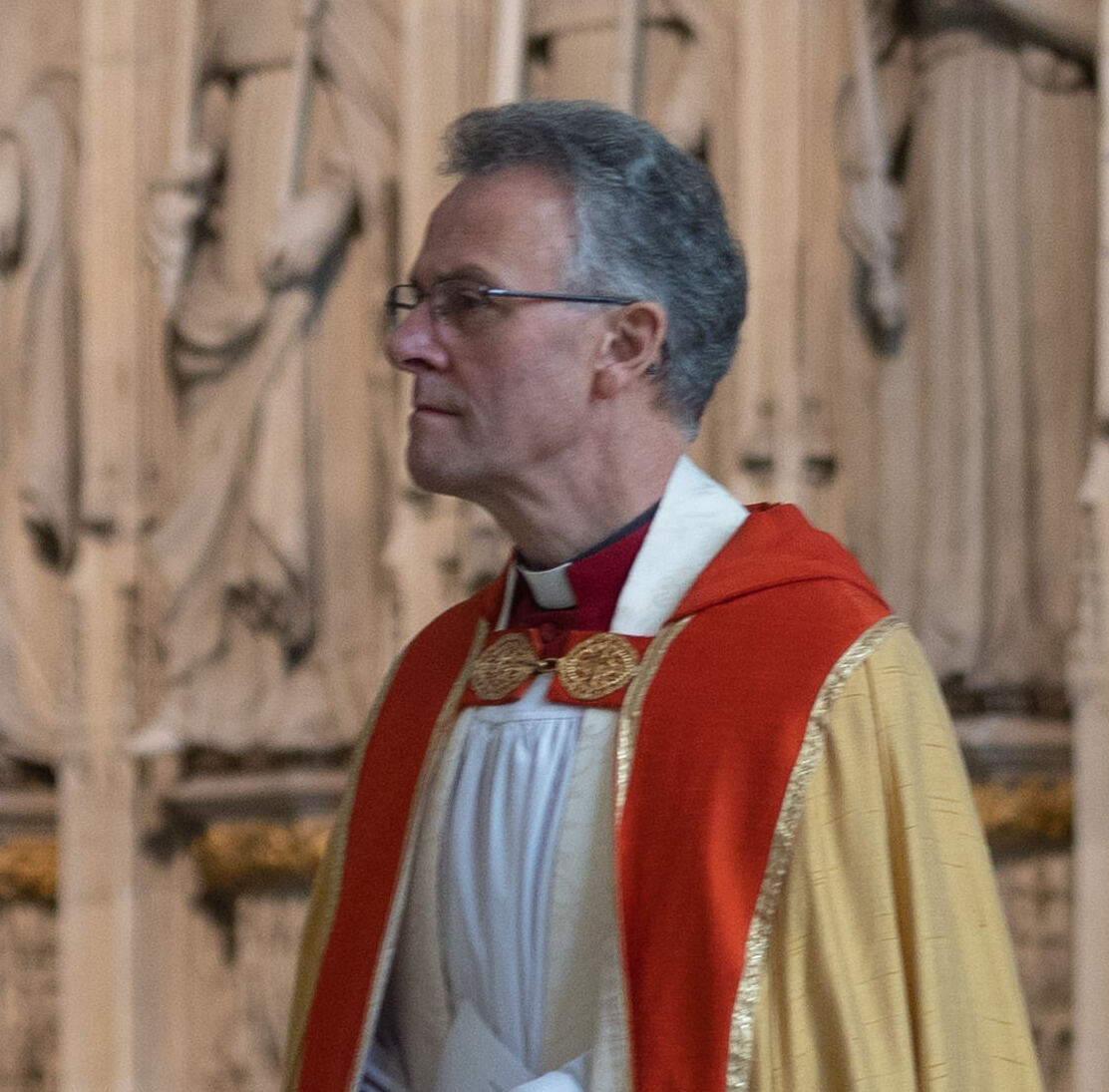
- Dobson in 2024
- Church: Church of England
- Diocese: Diocese of Leeds
- In office: 2014–present
- Predecessor: Keith Jukes

Orders
- Ordination: 1989 (deacon); 1990 (priest)

Personal details
- Born: John Richard Dobson; 16 November 1964 (age 61) Swillington, West Riding of Yorkshire, United Kingdom
- Denomination: Anglicanism
- Spouse: Nicola
- Children: Two
- Education: Garforth Comprehensive School
- Alma mater: Durham University; Ripon College Cuddesdon

John Richard Dobson DL (born 16 November 1964) is a British Church of England priest. Since 2014, he has been the dean of Ripon. Previously, he was a curate in County Durham and a vicar in Darlington. He also held the senior posts of area dean of Darlington and chair of the House of Clergy of the Durham Diocesan Synod.

== Early life ==
Dobson was born on 16 November 1964 in Swillington, Tadcaster Rural District, West Riding of Yorkshire. He was educated at Garforth Comprehensive School, a state school in Garforth, West Yorkshire. He studied theology at Van Mildert College, Durham University, and graduated with a Bachelor of Arts (BA) degree in 1987. That year, he entered Ripon College Cuddesdon, an Anglican theological college, and spent the next two years preparing for ordination.

== Ordained ministry ==
Dobson was ordained in the Church of England as a deacon in 1989 and as a priest in 1990. From 1989 to 1992, he served his curacy at St Cuthbert's Church, Benfieldside in the Diocese of Durham. He then moved to Darlington, where he was assistant curate of the town's St Cuthbert's Church from 1992 to 1996. From 1996 to 1998, he was Clerk in Charge at All Saints and Salutation Church, Darlington. He was vicar of that church from 1998 to 2014. In addition, he was priest-in-charge of St Edwin's Church, High Coniscliffe. Further to his parochial duties, he was area dean of Darlington from 2001 to 2014. He was made an honorary canon of Durham Cathedral in 2008. From 2009 to 2014, he served as chair of the House of Clergy of the Durham Diocesan Synod.

In March 2014, he was announced as the new dean of Ripon to succeed Keith Jukes who died the previous year. On 14 June 2014, he was installed as dean at Ripon Cathedral.

He is a Deputy Lieutenant of North Yorkshire.

== Personal life ==
Dobson is married to Nicola. She is a primary school head teacher. Together, they have two children.
