= John Wilson (Dean of Ripon) =

Former Anglican vicar in England

John Wilson (5 November 1586 – 19 February 1635) was an eminent Anglican priest in the first half of the 17th century.

Educated at Christ Church, Oxford, Wilson was Headmaster of Westminster School from 1610 to 1622; the incumbent at Bedale, Burneston then St Mary's Church, Castlegate, York; a canon of Westminster and Lincoln from 1623; and Dean of Ripon from 1624; and Master of the Savoy from 1629.
