= Heneage Dering =

Heneage Dering, LL.D (1665–1750) was an eminent Anglican priest in the first half of the 18th century. He became Dean of Ripon and was known also as a Latin poet.

== Life ==
He was born in London, the son of the barrister Christopher Dering and his wife Elizabeth Spackman, and godson of Heneage Finch, 1st Earl of Nottingham, He went to St Albans Grammar School. He was admitted to the Inner Temple in 1678, and also studied at Clare College, Cambridge, where he matriculated in 1680, but left in 1682 without a degree.

Called to the bar in 1690, Dering went to work as a secretary for John Sharp, once chaplain to Finch and now the Archbishop of York, the following year. He was ordained in 1701.

Dering was Archdeacon of the East Riding from 1702 to 1710; held the living at Scrayingham from 1704 until 1749; and was Dean of Ripon from 1710 until his death on 8 April 1750.

== Works ==
Dering published two book-length poems in Latin hexameters:

- Reliquiae Eboracenses (1743), concerned with Yorkshire under the Romans, translated into English heroic stanzas by Thomas Gent;
- De senectute (1746), related by an oak tree in Studley Royal Park, possibly satirically aimed at John Aislabie.

== Family ==
Dering was a notably wealthy cleric, inheriting family property. He married in 1712 Anne Sharp, eldest daughter of Archbishop John Sharp; they had three sons and five daughters. Of the children:

- John (1715–1774) and Heneage (1719–1802) were clerics.
- Elizabeth (1713–1777) married Charles Elsley.
- Mary (1721–1798) married John Sharp, Archdeacon of Northumberland.
