= Christopher Wyvill (priest) =

English Anglican priest

Christopher Wyvill, D.D. was an eminent Anglican priest in the first half of the 18th century.

The seventh son of Sir Christopher Wyvill, 3rd Baronet, M.P. for Richmond, he was educated at Trinity College, Cambridge. He was ordained in 1678. He was a Canon of York from 1700 until his death in January 1710.
