= Darley Waddilove =

Robert Darley Waddilove (born Robert Darley; known after 1762 as Darley Waddilove; November 1736 – 18 August 1828) was Dean of Ripon.

Waddilove was born in November 1736, the son of Abel Darley of Boroughbridge. This branch of the Darley family had lived for four generations at Ripley in Yorkshire, but the Waddilove's father migrated to Scoreby in East Riding. He was educated at Westminster School and Clare Hall, Cambridge, of which society he became a scholar, but was unable to take a fellowship, having inherited landed property at Boroughbridge from his uncle, Robert Waddilove (d. 1762), president of Barnard's Inn, whose name he assumed. He graduated BA in 1759, and MA in 1762. He was curate of Wotton in Surrey, and in 1767 rector of Whitby. From 1771 to 1779, he was chaplain to Thomas Robinson, 2nd Baron Grantham, ambassador to the Court at Madrid, during which time he exchanged Whitby for Topcliffe, and appointed himself rector of Cherry Burton, both in Yorkshire. In 1780, he became prebendary of Ripon, 1782 prebendary of York, and in 1786 Archdeacon of the East Riding. He was chaplain to Robert Hay Drummond and William Markham, Archbishops of York, and in 1791 became Dean of Ripon. He received the degree of LLD from John Moore (Archbishop of Canterbury).

He held both the deanery of Ripon and the archdeaconry until his death. During his residence in Spain, Waddilove became friends with Abbe Bayer, tutor to the Spanish court, and had access to the library of the Escorial, where he collated the manuscript of Strabo for Thomas Falconer's edition (Clarendon Press, 2 vols. fol. 1807), and obtained much useful information for Robertson's History of America, which the historian gratefully acknowledges in the preface. He also wrote remarks on the pictures in the king of Spain's collection which had formerly belonged to Charles I of England, translated Mengs's Essay on Painting (2 vols. London, 1796), and received from Infante Gabriel of Spain a copy of the translation of Sallust made by the prince. In 1775, while in Spain, he was elected a fellow of the Society of Antiquaries, for which he wrote several papers, among them 'An Historical and Descriptive Account of Ripon Minster' (Archæologia, vols. xvi. and xvii.) At his death he left to the library of York Minster a magnificent copy of Falconer's 'Strabo,' and of the rare work Bibliotheca Arábica del Escurial. Waddilove was an active magistrate and zealous in his ecclesiastical duties; in one instance he was recorded as having destroyed a stage to prevent an illegal boxing match in the village of Grewelthorpe near Ripon. He was president of the Society for the Relief of the North Riding Clergy, and earnestly promoted its interests. His private charities were extensive, and he gave on several occasions large sums to increase the endowments of parishes in his own patronage or that of the chapter. Waddilove died at the deanery, Ripon, on 18 August 1828.

On 3 April 1781, at the age of 45, he married Anne Hope Grant, daughter of Ludovic Grant (Luss in Argyll) who was 10 years his junior. Anne died in May 1797 after a long and painful illness, aged just 51.

Waddilove's eldest son, Thomas Darley Waddilove, died in March 1799 aged only 17, and his youngest son (another priest), Robert Darley Waddilove, died in Penzance, Cornwall in July 1813 at the age of 24.

The only one of Waddilove's sons to father children was William James Darley Waddilove MA (Hons. Cantab. St John's); he became chaplain to the Duke of Roxburghe and married Elizabeth Anne, the sister of the statesman James Graham of Netherby. William was the father of naval lieutenant Robert Waddilove and admiral Charles Waddilove of Beacon Grange, Hexham. One of the Waddilove's daughters, Georgiana Maria, married Charles Christopher Oxley, of Minster House, Ripon.
