= Ripon Cathedral =

Cathedral in Ripon, North Yorkshire, England

Coordinates: 54°8′5″N 1°31′12″W

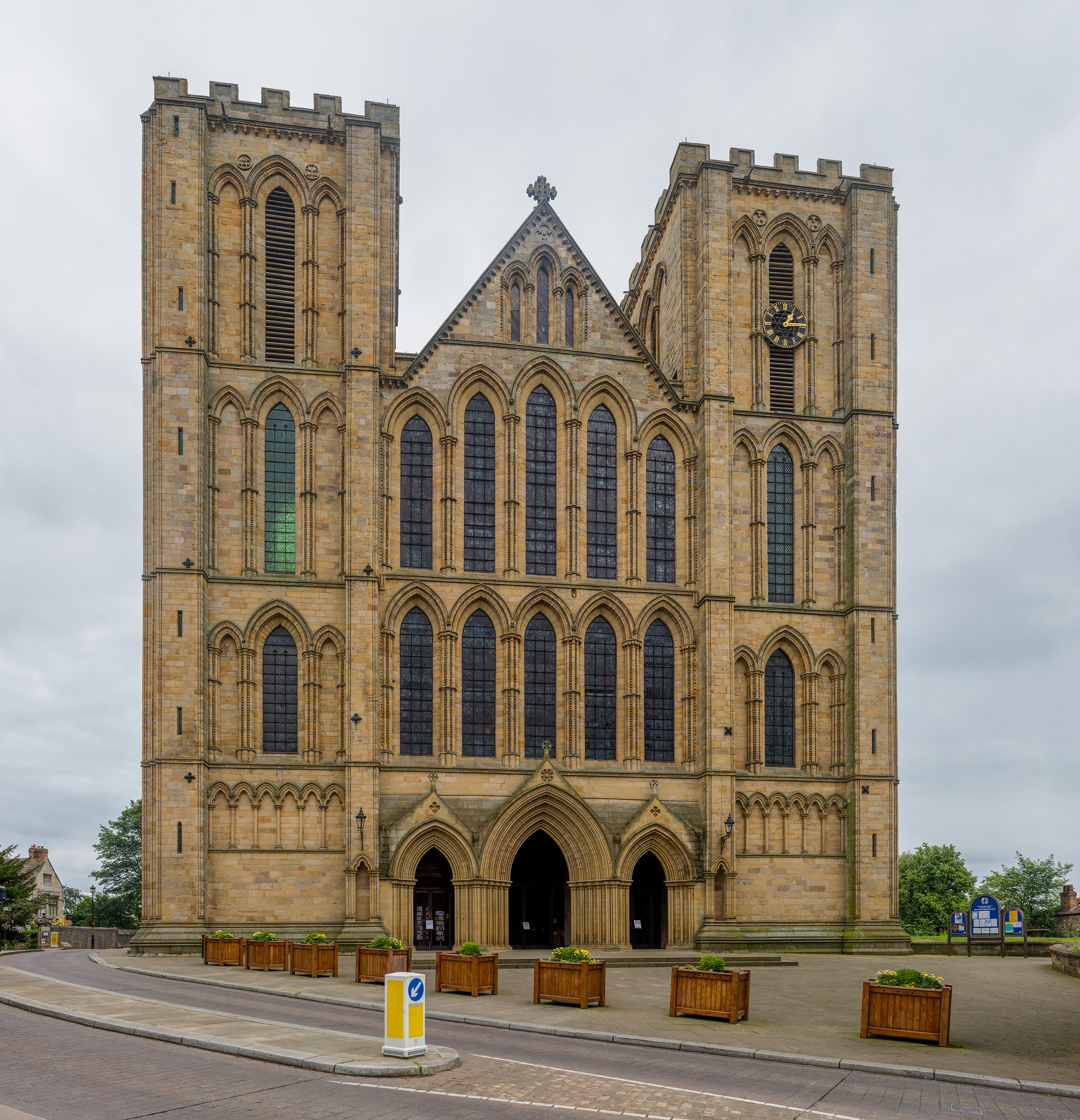
- The west front of the cathedral

- Shown within North Yorkshire
- OS grid reference: SE 31446 71129
- Location: Minster Road, Ripon, North Yorkshire HG4 1QT
- Country: England
- Denomination: Church of England
- Previous denomination: Roman Catholic
- Tradition: Liberal Anglo-Catholic
- Website: Official website

History
- Status: Cathedral (since 1836)

Architecture
- Functional status: Active
- Heritage designation: Grade I
- Style: Anglo-Saxon, Gothic (Early English)
- Years built: 1160–1547

Administration
- Province: York
- Diocese: Leeds

Clergy
- Dean: John Dobson

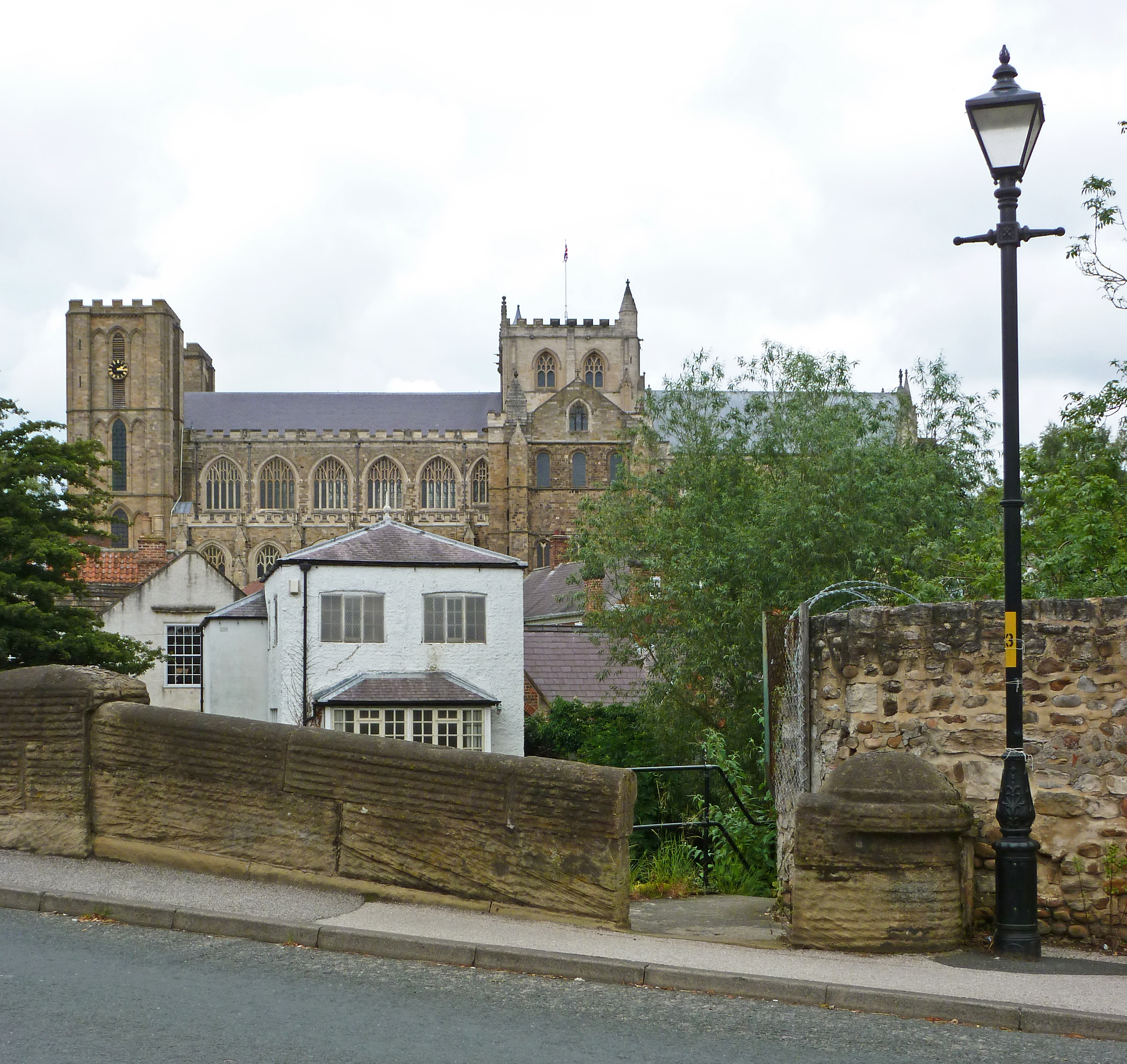
Cathedral with its two west towers (left) and its central tower

The Cathedral Church of St Peter and St Wilfrid, commonly known as Ripon Cathedral, and until 1836 known as Ripon Minster, is a cathedral in Ripon, North Yorkshire, England. Founded as a monastery by monks of the Irish tradition in the 660s, it was refounded as a Benedictine monastery by St Wilfrid in 672. The church became collegiate in the tenth century, and acted as a mother church within the large Diocese of York for the remainder of the Middle Ages. The present church is the fourth, and was built between the 13th and 16th centuries. In 1836 the church became the cathedral for the Diocese of Ripon. In 2014 the Diocese was incorporated into the new Diocese of Leeds, and the church became one of three co-equal cathedrals of the Bishop of Leeds.

The cathedral is notable architecturally for its gothic west front in the Early English style, considered one of the best of its type, as well as the Geometric east window. The seventh-century crypt of Wilfrid's church is a significant example of early Christian architecture in England. The cathedral has Grade I listed building status.

== Background ==
There has been a stone church on the site since 672, when Saint Wilfrid replaced the previous timber church of the monastery at Ripon (a daughter house of Saint Aidan's monastery at Melrose) with one in the Roman style. This was one of the earliest stone buildings erected in the Kingdom of Northumbria. The crypt dates from this period.

== History ==
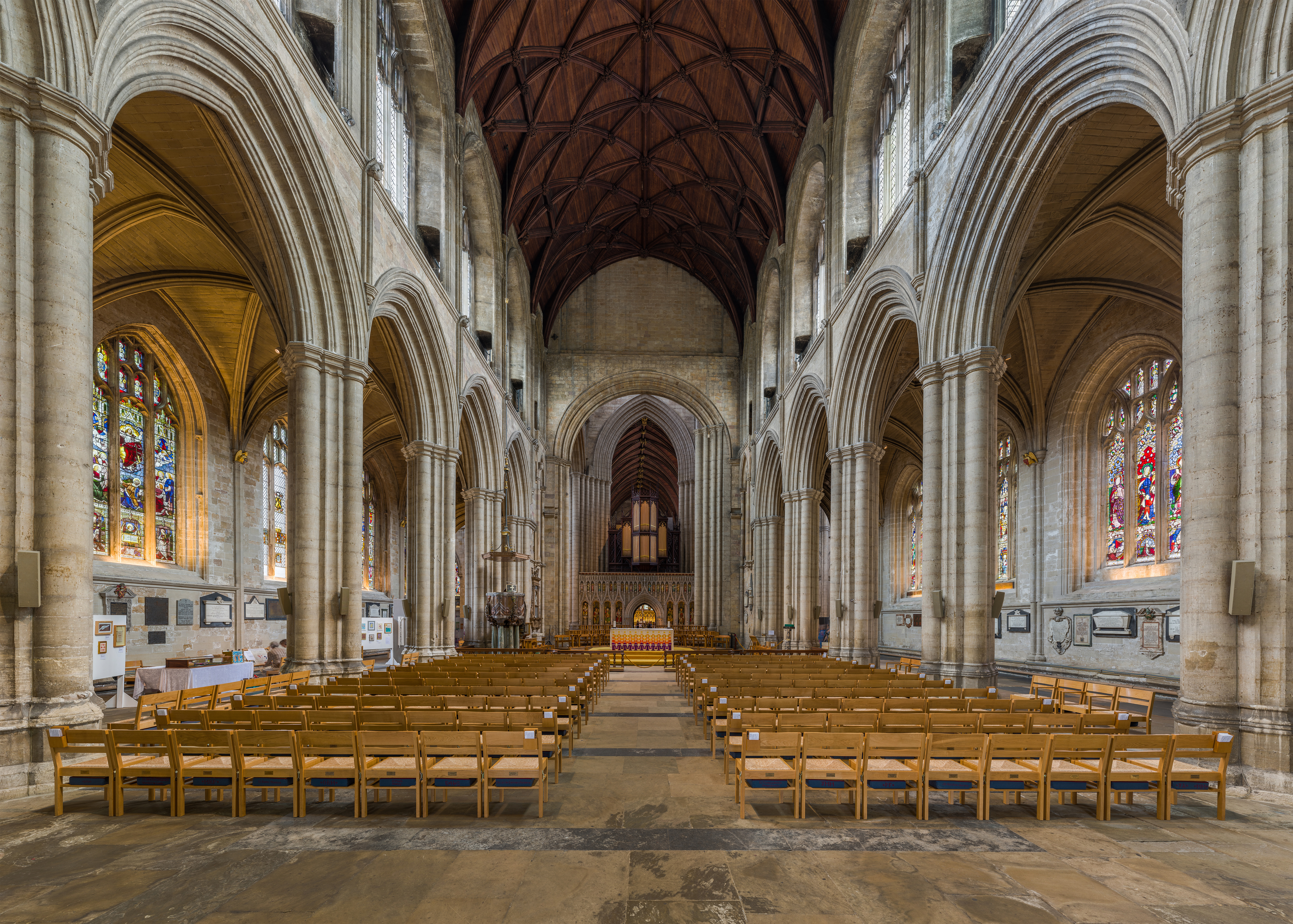
The nave

Today's church is the fourth to have stood on this site. Saint Wilfrid brought stonemasons, plasterers and glaziers from France and Italy to build his great basilica in AD 672. A contemporary account by Stephen of Ripon tells us:

In Ripon, Saint Wilfrid built and completed from the foundations to the roof a church of dressed stone, supported by various columns and side-aisles to a great height and many windows, arched vaults and a winding cloister.

Saint Wilfrid was buried in this church near the high altar. Devastated by the English king Eadred in AD 948 as a warning to the Archbishop of York, only the crypt of Wilfrid's church survived but today this tiny 7th-century chapel rests complete beneath the later grandeur of Archbishop Roger de Pont l’Evêque's 12th century minster. A second minster soon arose at Ripon, but it too perished – this time in 1069 at the hands of William the Conqueror. Thomas of Bayeux, first Norman Archbishop of York, then instigated the construction of a third church, traces of which were incorporated into the later chapter house of Roger's minster.

The Early English west front was added in 1220, its twin towers originally crowned with wooden spires and lead. The east window was built as part of a reconstruction of the choir between 1286–8 and 1330, and was described by architecture critic Pevsner as a 'splendid' example of the series of large Decorated Gothic windows constructed in Northern England. Major rebuilding had to be postponed due to the outbreak of the Wars of the Roses but resumed after the accession of Henry VII and the restoration of peace in 1485. The crossing tower was rebuilt after it collapsed in an earthquake in 1450 but was never completed. Between 1501 and 1522 the nave walls were raised higher and the aisles added. The church's thirty-four misericords were carved between 1489 and 1494. The same (Ripon) school of carvers also carved the misericords at Beverley Minster and Manchester Cathedral. But in 1547, before this work was finished, Edward VI dissolved Ripon's college of canons. All revenues were appropriated by the Crown and the tower never received its last Perpendicular arches. It was not until 1604 that James I issued his Charter of Restoration.

During the Civil War, much of the stained glass was smashed and some of the statues were destroyed.

The minster finally became a cathedral (the church where the Bishop has his cathedra or throne) in 1836, the focal point of the newly created Anglican Diocese of Ripon – the first to be established since the Reformation.

== Dean and chapter ==
As of 30 December 2020:

- Dean – John Dobson (since 14 June 2014 installation)
- Canon Precentor – Michael Gisbourne (since 16 September 2018 installation)
- Canon Educator (i.e. Canon Chancellor) – Barry Pyke (since 11 September 2016 installation; previously called "Canon for Rural Engagement and Education")
- Canon Pastor – Ailsa Newby (since June 2017); Newby is also The Lady Newby by her marriage to the Liberal politician Lord Newby.

== Music ==
The current director of music is Dr Ronny Krippner, with Tim Harper as assistant director of music.

=== Organ ===
The cathedral has a fine organ by Harrison and Harrison, which is a rebuild of the original Lewis instrument dating from 1878. The organ console is above the screen and has casework by Gilbert Scott. There is a second mobile console in the nave. A specification for the organ can be found on the National Pipe Organ Register. The organ last underwent a major refurbishment in 2013. These works included a thorough cleaning and repair of all pipe work. An unusual feature is a carved wooden hand, extending from the organ's casing, which can be raised and lowered using an articulated wooden lever connected to the keyboard console - it is thought to have been used to conduct the choir, after the organ was rebuilt in such a way that the organist's seat no longer afforded a view of the stalls.

=== Organists ===
In 1447, the organ at Ripon Cathedral was played by a priest, Thomas Litster. Notable organists have included composers Charles Harry Moody and Ronald Edward Perrin.

=== Bells ===
A ring of 12 bells with an additional 'flat sixth' bell is hung in the south-west tower. A diatonic ring of ten bells was cast in 1932, and three additional bells were installed in 2008 with two new trebles being added to give a diatonic ring of twelve, and an additional 'flat sixth' bell to give a light ring of eight.

== Fixtures and fittings ==
=== Font ===
The cathedral's marble font dates from the late 1400s. It was made from Teesdale marble quarried at Eggleston, County Durham.

=== Clock ===
The 1379 Fabric Rolls of the Minster mention “le clok”. In 1453 John Ripley de Ebor was employed by Ripon Minster on the clock. In 1724, George Mills of Ripon made a new clock for Ripon Cathedral and repaired the existing chimes.

In 1891 the number of bells in the tower was increased from eight to ten, and Cambridge chimes were added to the clock tower by J. Shaw and Company of Bradford.

A new clock was installed by William Potts of Leeds in 1906. The existing dial on the west front was retained, and a new dial provided on the south side of the tower, both dials being 7 feet (2.1 m) in diameter. The clock struck the hours of the great bell and chimes Cambridge Quarters. The escapement was based on that devised by Lord Grimethorpe.

=== Artwork ===
The Cathedral possesses 18 portraits depicting Tudor royalty.

== Gallery ==
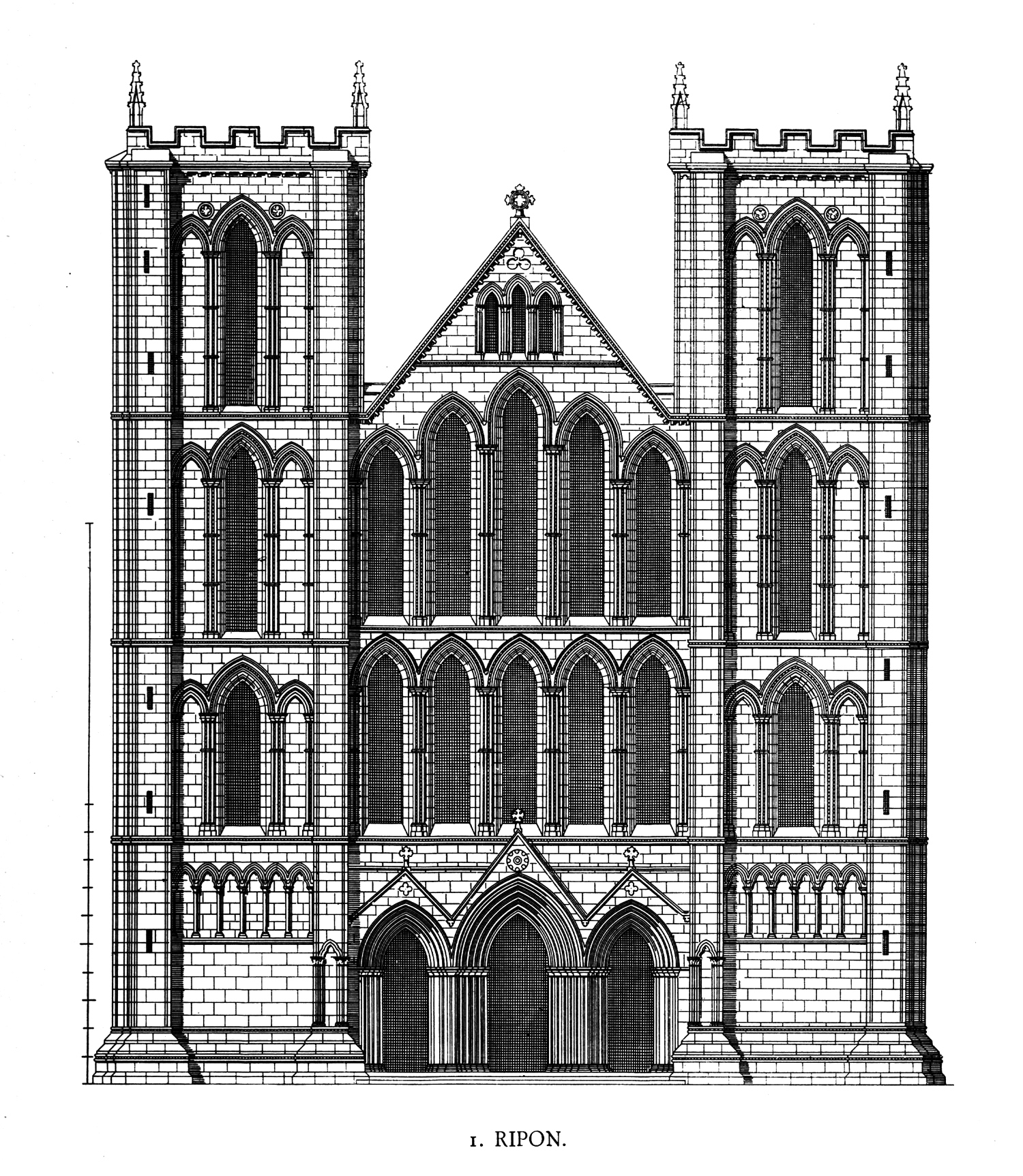
Engraving of the west front.

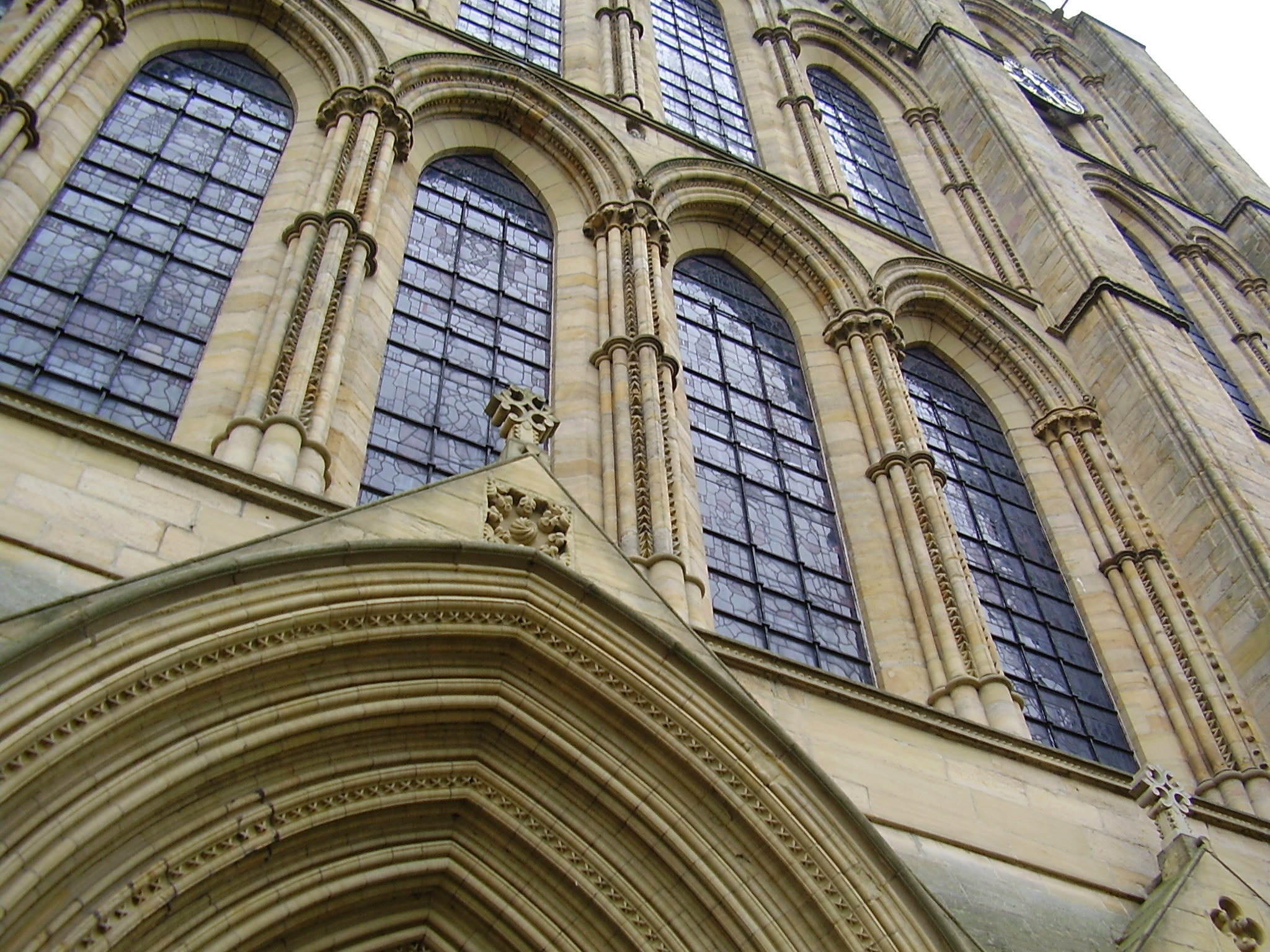
Detail of the western façade.

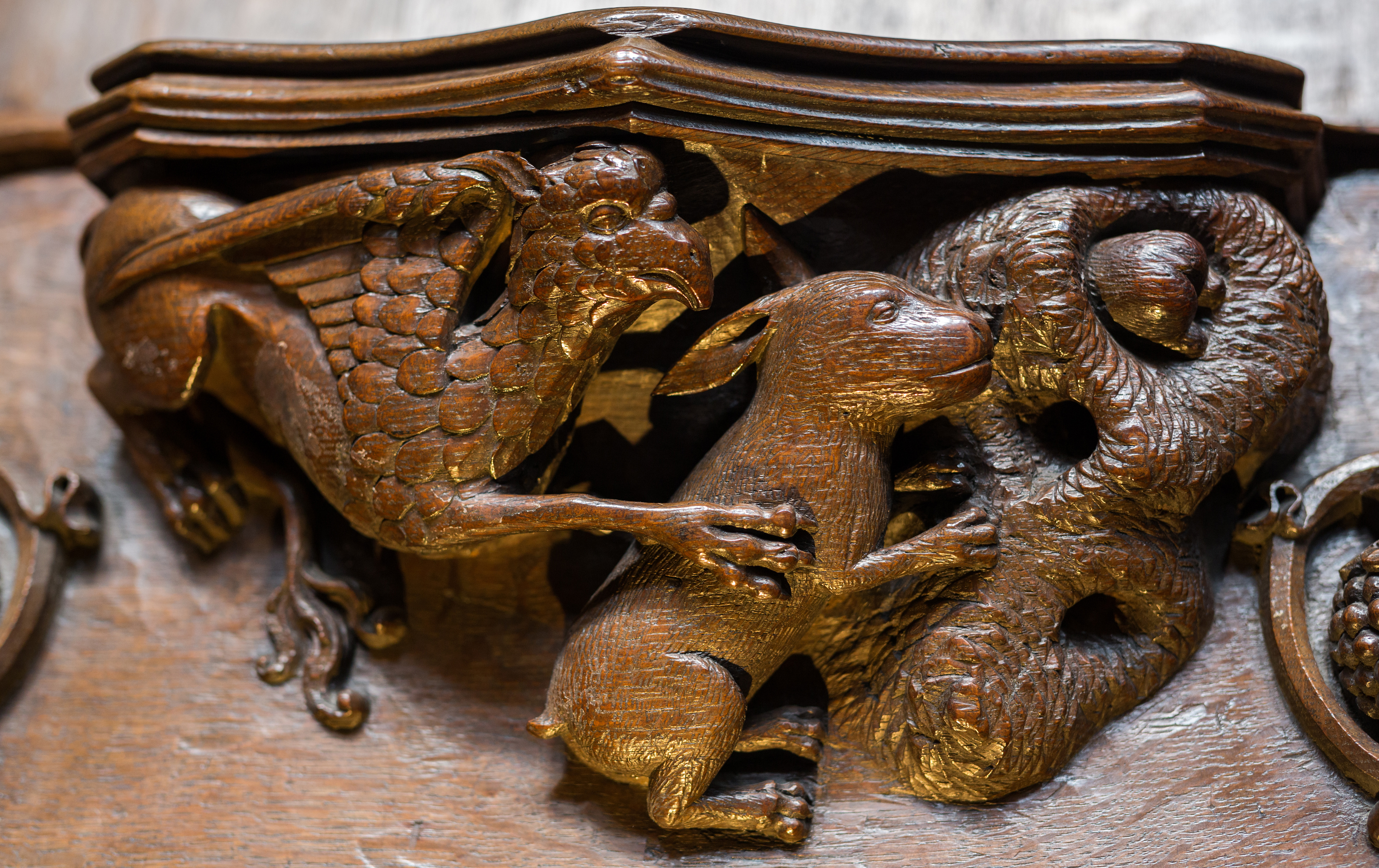
A misericord, alleged inspiration for Lewis Carroll's Alice's Adventures in Wonderland

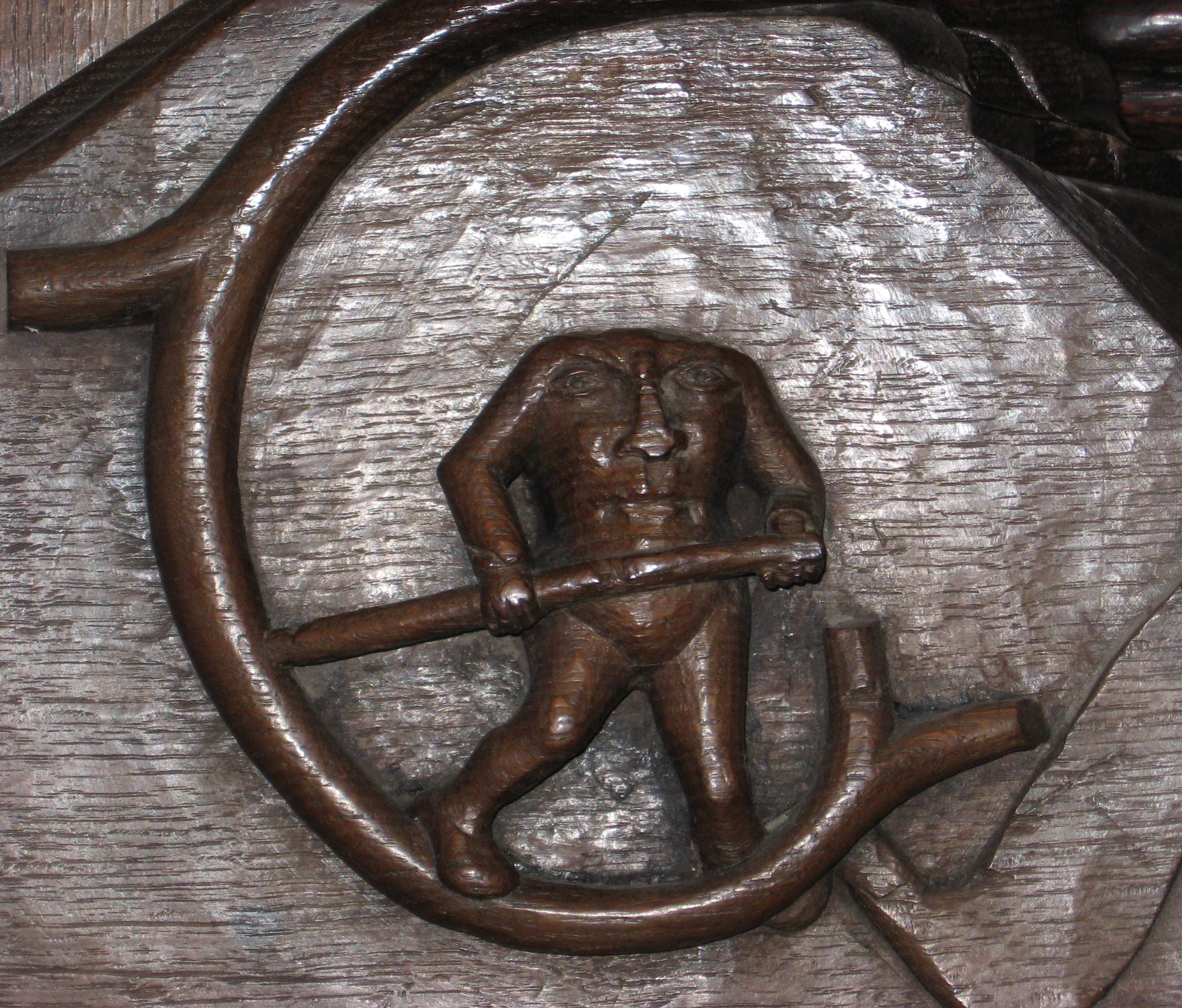
A blemyah carving from a choir stall.

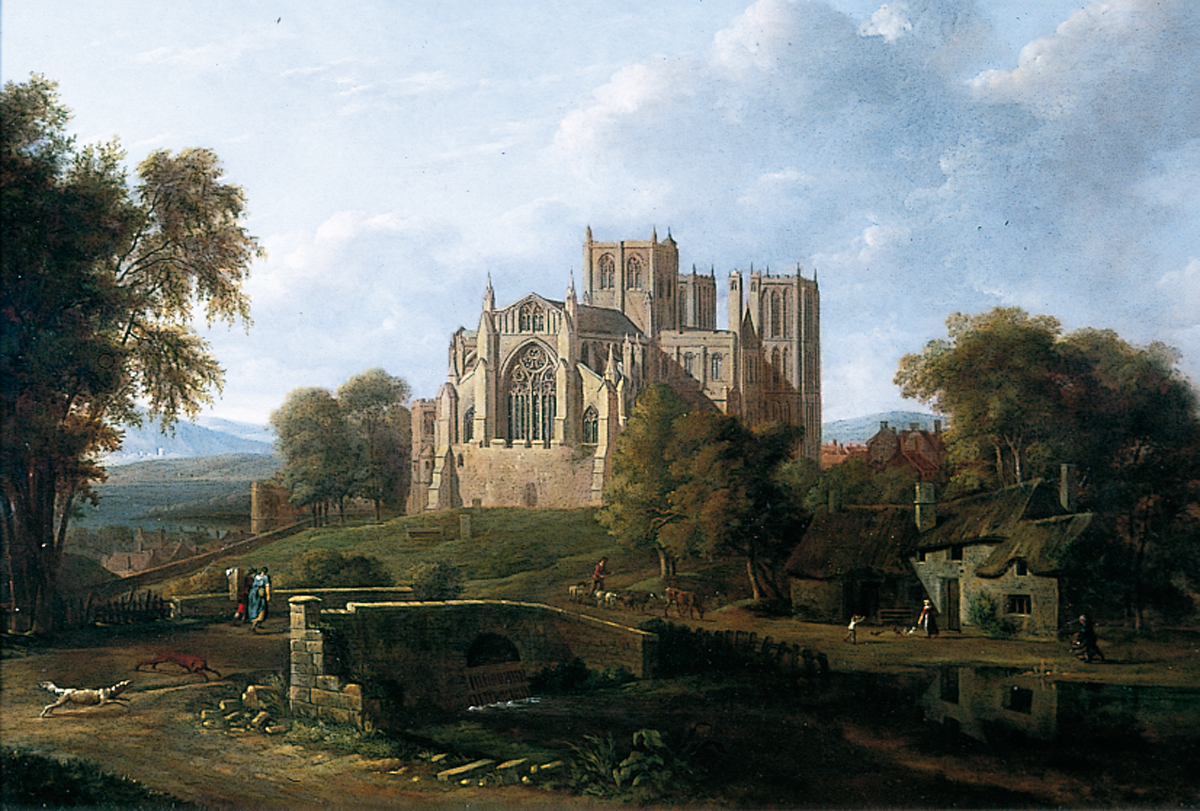
Ripon Minster, by Hendrik Frans de Cort, c. 1800.

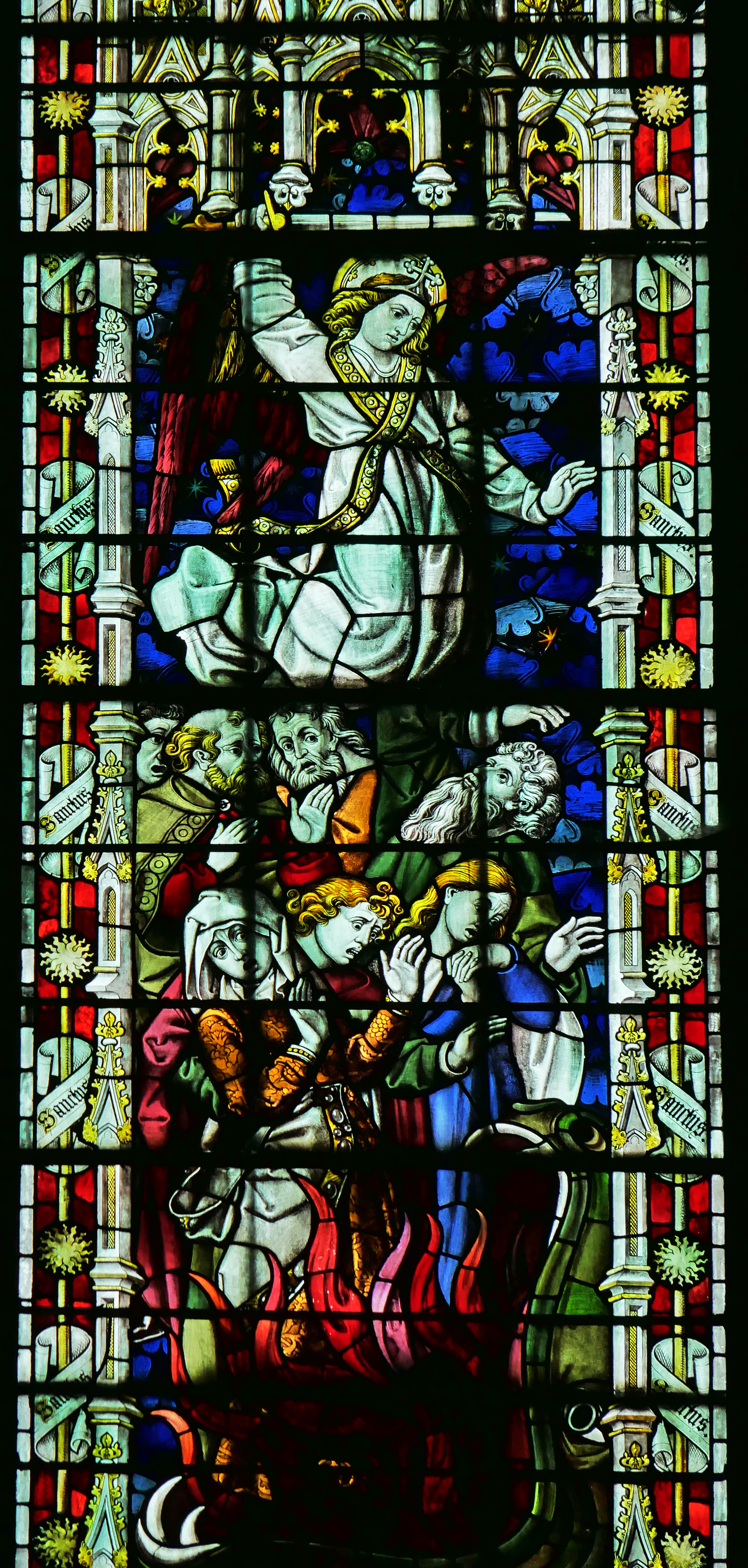
Stained glass window of St Michael, West end

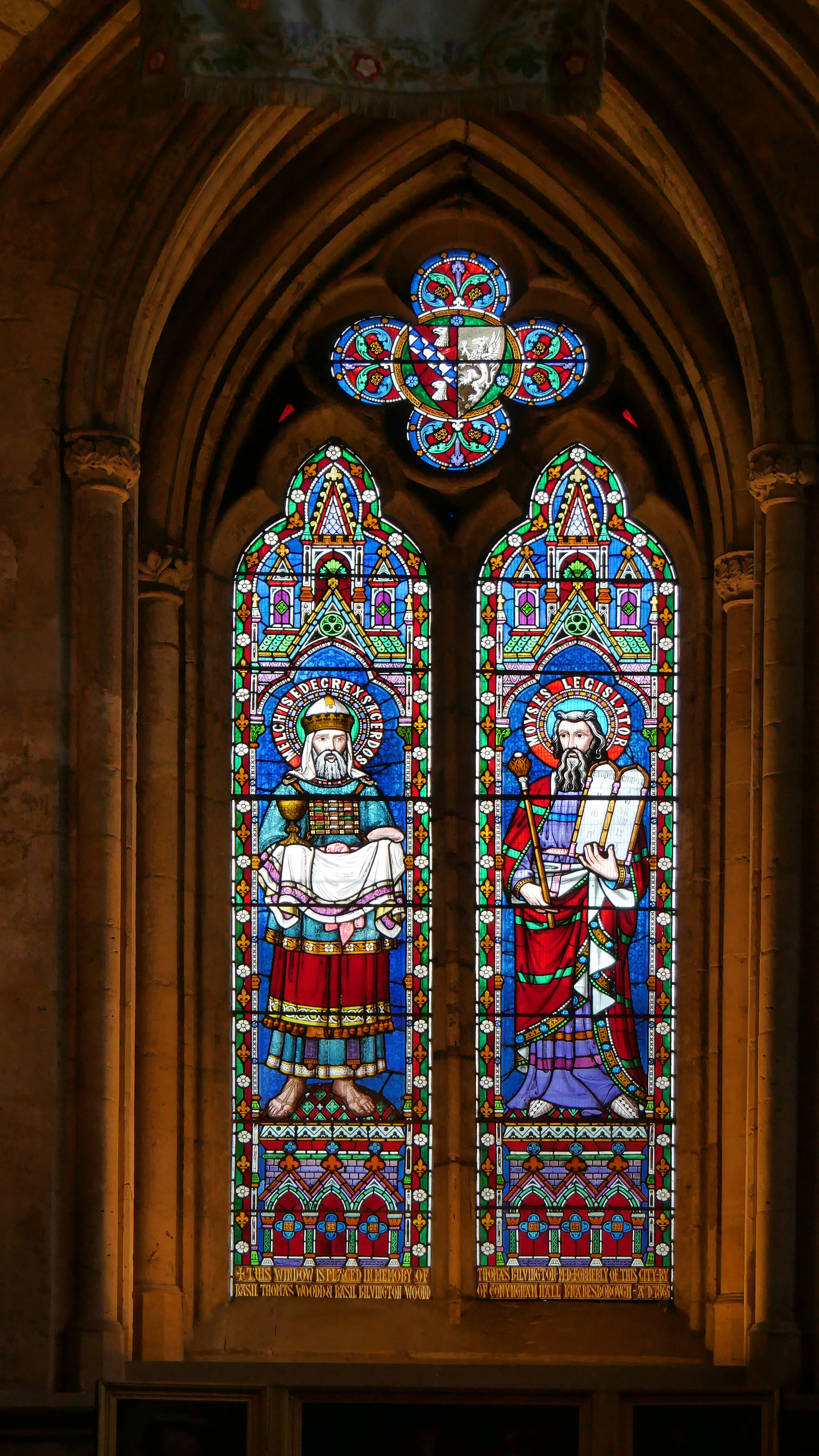
Moses and Melchizedek; Stained glass window, St Peter's chapel

Stained-glass window near the West entrance, the only one to keep pieces of medieval stained glass

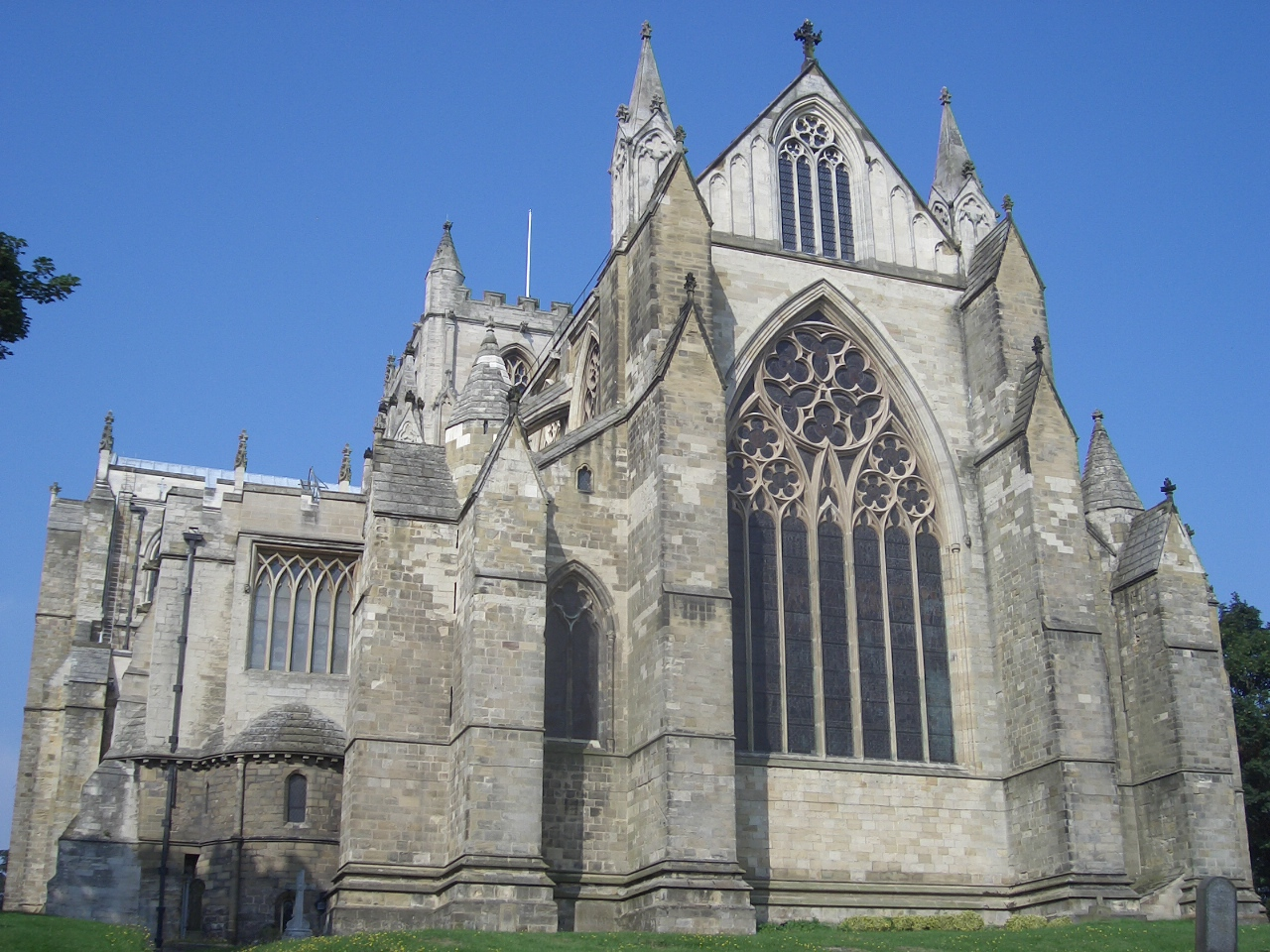
The eastern façade of the cathedral

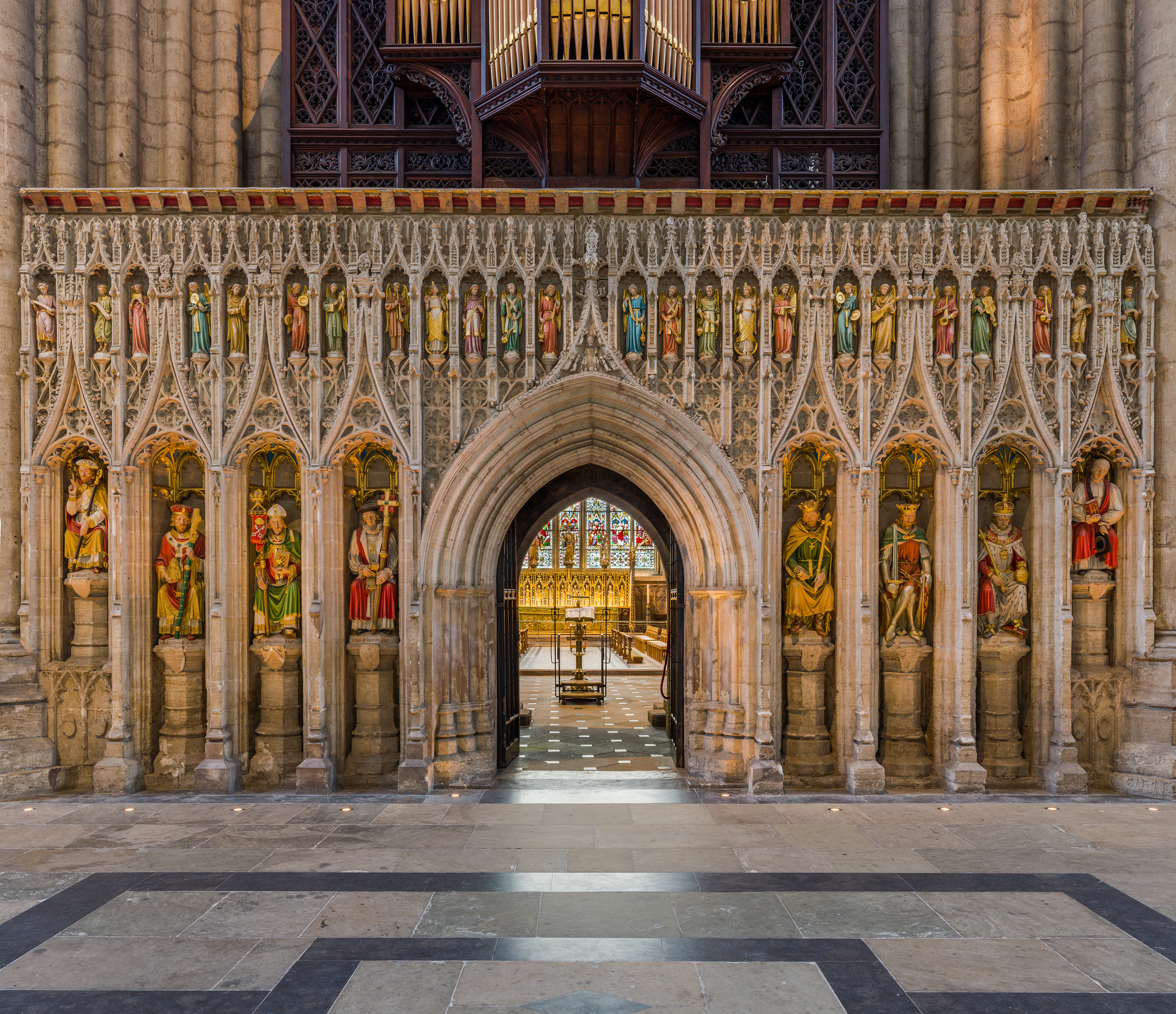
The Rood screen

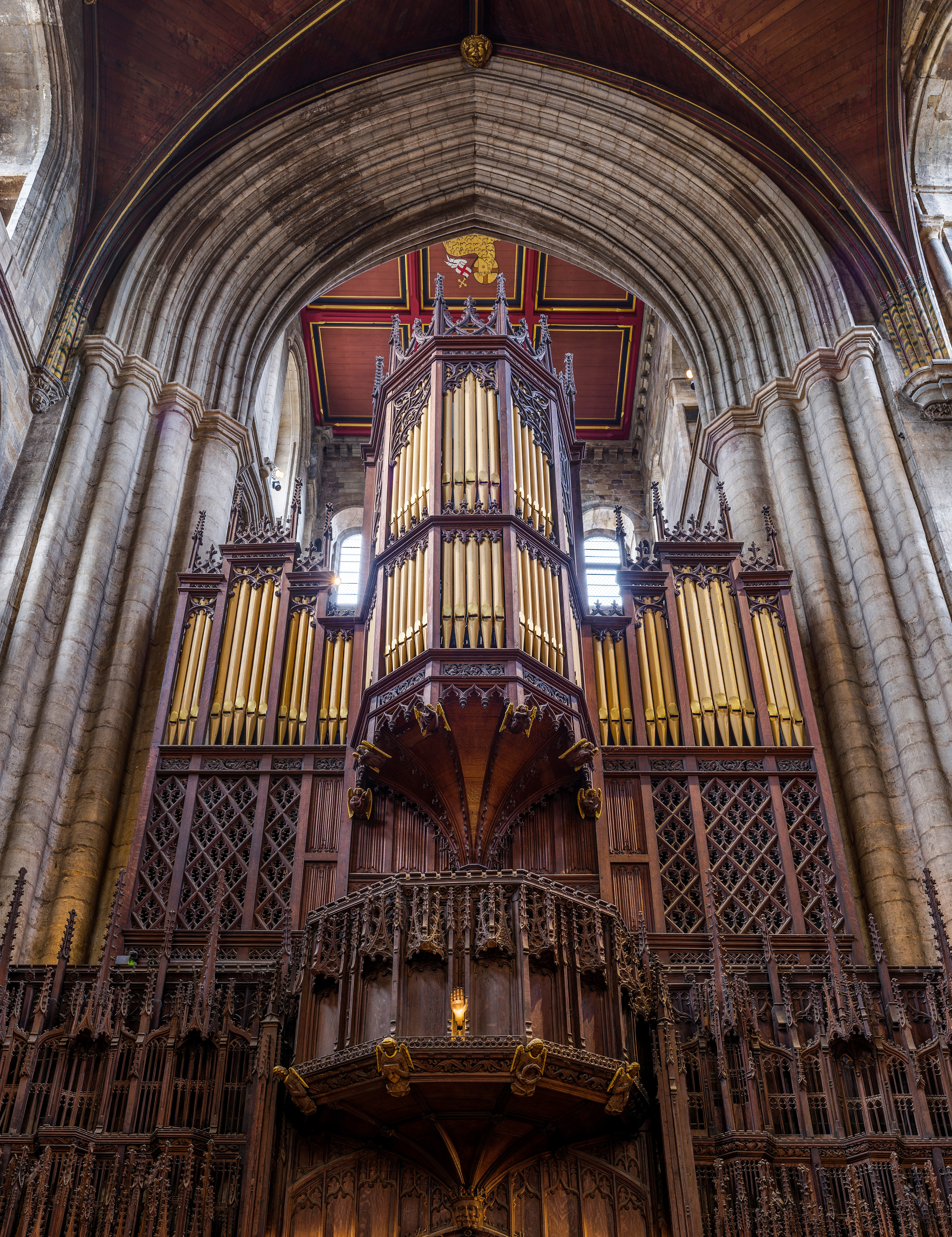
The Organ

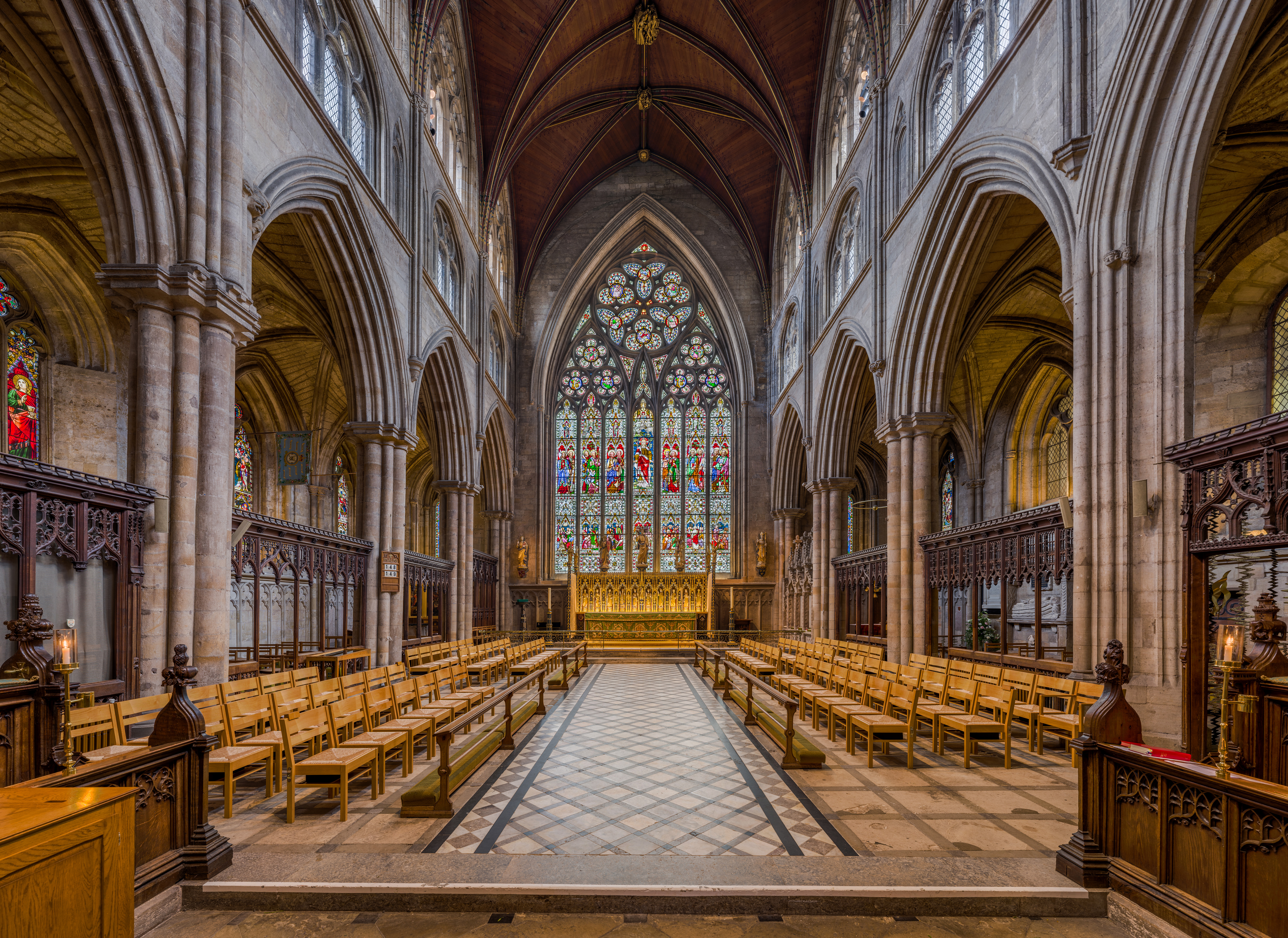
The Choir of Ripon Cathedral

Baptismal font

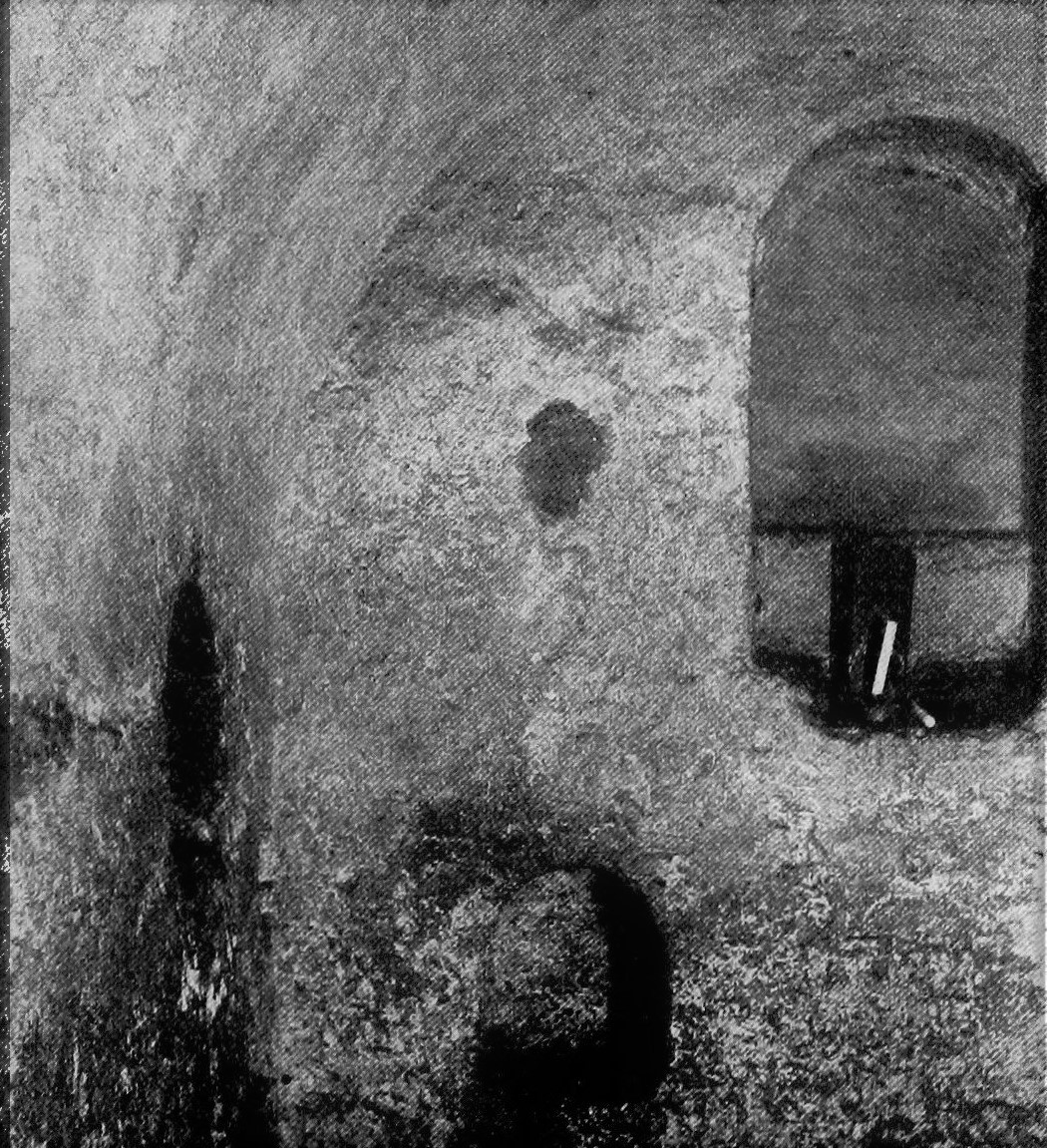
1901 photograph of the crypt

== See also ==
- Ripon
- Listed buildings in Ripon
- Grade I listed buildings in North Yorkshire (district)
- Architecture of the medieval cathedrals of England
- English Gothic architecture
- Romanesque architecture
- Church of England
- Diocese of Leeds
- Dean and Chapter of Ripon
- List of Gothic Cathedrals in Europe
