= Choir of St George's Chapel, Windsor Castle =

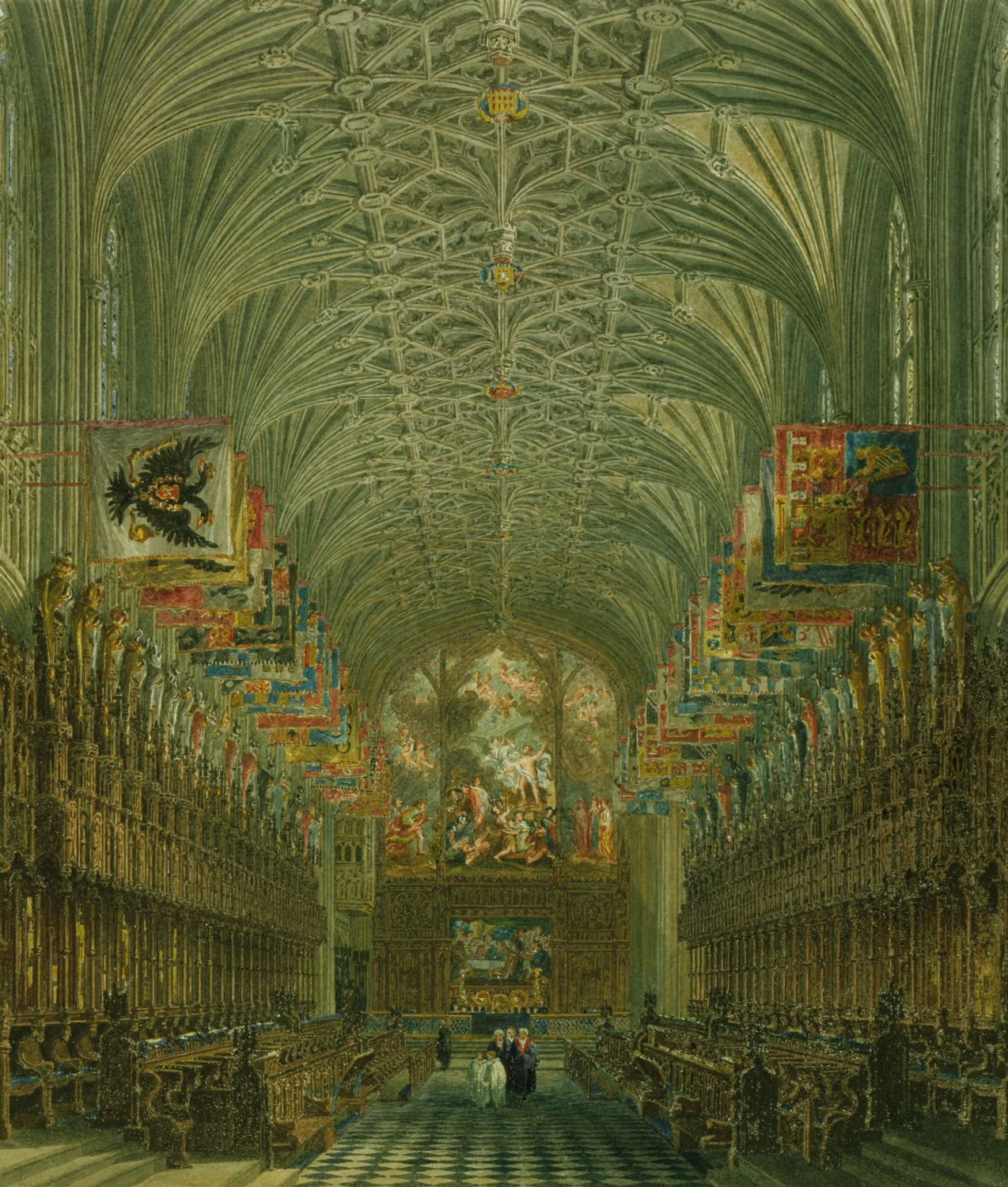
The Quire of St George's Chapel, by Charles Wild, from W.H. Pyne's Royal Residences, 1818.

The Choir of St George's Chapel at Windsor Castle exists to sing services in St George's Chapel at Windsor Castle.

It has been in existence since 1348 and, with the exception of the Commonwealth period (1649–1660), has sung services in the Chapel continuously ever since.

== The choir today ==
The choir comprises up to 23 choristers (the youngest of whom are probationers or training choristers) and 12 professional Lay Clerks, who sing alto, tenor and bass. The Choir sings at Evensong each day (except Wednesdays) and at Mattins and Eucharist on Sunday mornings during the three terms of the College year. The choristers are educated at St George's School, Windsor Castle which is situated in the Castle grounds. The Lay Clerks live in the Horseshoe Cloister and on Denton's Commons.

The choir sings regularly in the presence of the King and other members of the Royal Family.

Concerts are also given from time to time, some collaborating with ensembles such as the London Concert Orchestra, the London Handel Orchestra, Southbank Sinfonia and the London Mozart Players. The choir also broadcasts regularly on BBC Radio 3 and BBC Radio 4.

The choir is directed by the Director of Music and accompanied the Assistant Director of Music, plus an organ scholar who is selected by audition on an annual basis.

In January 2022 – two months after the first woman became a lay clerk there – it was announced that the choir would admit girl choristers from the following year, forming a mixed treble line.

== List of Organists and Masters of Choristers (known as 'Director of Music' from 2004) ==
- Walter Whitby 1406–1415
- Laurence Dreweryn 1415–1441
- John Wederby 1441–1461
- Thomas Rolfe 1461–1469
- Robert Cotyngham 1469–1473
- William Browne 1473–1476
- Thomas Rolfe 1476–1489
- Tuke, Bell, Bowyer, Bednall and Rede (acted jointly)
- Richard Wood 1496–1531
- John Marbeck, 1531–1547
- George Thaxton 1547–1559
- Preston 1559–1563
- Robert Golder 1563–1564
- Richard Farrant, 1564–1580
- John Mundy 1581–1585
- Nathaniel Giles 1585–1632
- William Child 1632–1697
- John Golding 1697–1719
- John Pigott 1719–1756
- Edward Webb 1756–1788
- Theodore Aylward Sr., 1788–1801
- William Sexton 1801–1824
- Karl Friedrich Horn 1824–1830
- Highmore Skeats 1830–1835
- Sir George Job Elvey, 1835–1882
- Sir Walter Parratt, 1882–1924
- The Revd Canon Edmund Fellowes, 1924–1927, Acting Master of the Choristers, with GS Kitchingman and later Malcolm Boyle, as Acting Organist
- Sir Henry Walford Davies, 1927–1932
- Charles Hylton Stewart, 1932
- Sir William Henry Harris, 1933–1961
- Sidney Campbell 1961–1974
- Christopher Robinson 1974–1991
- Jonathan Rees-Williams 1991–2002
- Roger Judd (Acting) 2002–2004
- Timothy Byram-Wigfield, 2004–2013
- James Vivian, 2013–incumbent

=== Sub organists ===
- Richard Frank Martin Akerman 1900–1924
- Malcolm Boyle 1925–1932
- Reginald Alwyn Surplice 1932–1945
- John Morehen 1968–1972

=== Assistant Organists ===
- Charles Hancock ????–1875
- G.F. Huntley 1875–1880
- Hubert Hunt (?1880 – c.1885)
- Henry Walford Davies 1885–1890 (later Organist of the Temple Church London and subsequently Organist here 1927–1932 – see above)
- Richard Frank Martin Akerman 1900–1908 (afterwards Sub Organist)
- Harold William Rhodes 1908–1910 (later successively Organist of Coventry Cathedral and Winchester Cathedral)
- Reginald Alwyn Surplice 1927–1932 (afterwards Sub Organist here and later successively Organist of Bristol Cathedral and Winchester Cathedral)
- John Charles Stirling Forster 1941–1945
- Philip Harold Moore 1946–1949 (not the same as Philip Moore (organist) who was later Organist of Guildford Cathedral and York Minster)
- Lionel Frederick Dakers 1950–1954 (later Organist of Exeter Cathedral)
- Richard George Greening 1955–1959 (later Organist of Lichfield Cathedral)
- Clement McWilliam 1959–1965 (later Sub Organist of Winchester Cathedral)
- John Porter 1972–1985 (deceased while in office)
- Roger Judd 1985–2008
- Ben Giddens 2008–2009 (Acting)

=== Assistant Directors of Music ===
- Richard Pinel 2009–2016 (subsequently Director of Music at Jesus College, Cambridge, currently Director of Music at St Mary's, Bourne Street)
- Luke Bond 2017–incumbent

=== Organ Scholars ===
- Peter J Williams 1965–1966
- John Porter 1965–1967 (later Assistant Organist here)
- John Taylor 1965–1967 (then Assistant Organist of St Mary's Cathedral, Edinburgh)
- Terence Atkins 1967–1969 (later Organist and Choirmaster at St John the Baptist Parish Church, Chipping Barnet)
- Jason Smart 1969–1972
- Francis Grier 1972–1973 (afterwards Organ Scholar of King's College, Cambridge; later Organist and Master of the Choristers at Christ Church, Oxford)
- Colin Walsh 1973–1974 (afterwards Organ Scholar of Christ Church, Oxford; later Assistant Organist Salisbury Cathedral, Organist St Albans Cathedral, now Organist Laureate Lincoln Cathedral)
- Christopher Brayne 1974–1975 (later Organist and Master of the Choristers of Bristol Cathedral; now Director of Music at Christ Church, Charlotte, North Carolina)
- Thomas Trotter 1975–1976 (afterwards Organ Scholar of King's College, Cambridge, later Organist of St Margaret's Church, Westminster and Birmingham City Organist)
- Adrian Partington 1977–1978 (afterwards Organ Scholar of King's College, Cambridge; currently Director of Music Gloucester Cathedral)
- Harry Bicket 1978–1980 (Director, The English Concert)
- Wayne Marshall 1980–1983
- Iain Simcock 1983–1984
- Neil Kelly 1984–1986
- Andrew Nethsingha 1986–1987 (afterwards Organ Scholar of St John's College, Cambridge; currently Director of Music at Westminster Abbey)
- Roger Muttitt 1987–1988 (currently Director of Music at Durham School)
- Philip Scriven 1988–1990 (afterwards Organ Scholar of St John's College, Cambridge; then Sub-Organist of Winchester Cathedral; later Organist and Master of the Choristers at Lichfield Cathedral)
- Mark Wardell 1990–1991 (later Assistant Organist of Chichester Cathedral)
- Jonathan Lilley 1991–1992 (later Sub-Organist at Leeds Parish Church; then Assistant Organist at Ely Cathedral; currently Organist of Waltham Abbey Church)
- Christopher Allsop 1992–1993 (afterwards Organ Scholar of Trinity College, Cambridge; Assistant Organist at St. Philip's Cathedral, Birmingham; Assistant Organist and Assistant Director of Music, Worcester Cathedral; Assistant Director of Music, The King's School, Worcester; currently Organist of Eton College)
- Matthew Raisbeck 1993–1994
- Greg Morris 1994–1995 (currently Associate Organist Temple Church, London)
- Iain Farrington 1995–1996 (then Organ Scholar of St John's College, Cambridge)
- Myles Hartley 1996–1997
- Teilhard Scott 1997–1999
- Jonathan Vaughn 1999–2000 (afterwards Organ Scholar of St John's College, Cambridge; then Assistant Organist of Wells Cathedral)
- Robert Kwan 2000–2001 (Assistant to the Organist-Choirmaster, Christ & Holy Trinity Episcopal Church, Westport, CT; currently Director of Music, Trinity Episcopal Church, Southport, CT, USA)
- Francesca Massey 2001–2002 (Acting Assistant Organist September–December 2001; afterwards Organ Scholar of Gonville and Caius College, Cambridge; then Sub-Organist of Durham Cathedral; then Organist and Director of Music at Rochester Cathedral)
- Tom Winpenny 2002–2003 (Acting Assistant Organist; then Organ Scholar of King's College, Cambridge; then Sub-Organist, St Paul's Cathedral; currently Assistant Master of the Music, St Alban's Cathedral)
- Henry Parkes 2003–2004 (Acting Assistant Organist September–December 2003; then Organ Scholar of Christ Church, Oxford; later Associate Director of Music All Saints, Margaret Street, London)
- Ben Giddens 2004–2005 (afterwards Organ Scholar Norwich Cathedral; subsequently Acting Assistant Organist at St George's Chapel, Windsor Castle; later Assistant Organist Magdalen College, Oxford)
- Peter Stevens 2005–2006 (afterwards Organ Scholar of King's College, Cambridge; currently Assistant Master of Music, Westminster Cathedral)
- John Challenger 2006–2008 (afterwards Organ Scholar of St John's College, Cambridge; currently Assistant Director of Music at Salisbury Cathedral)
- Laurence Williams 2008–2009 (afterwards Choral Scholar at Trinity College, Cambridge)
- Alexander Binns 2009–2010 (afterwards studied organ at the Royal Academy of Music, London whilst Organ Scholar at Marylebone Parish Church, the Royal Hospital Chelsea, and Southwark Cathedral, currently Director of Music at Derby Cathedral)
- Ben Bloor 2010–2011 (afterwards Organ Scholar of New College, Oxford; later Organ Scholar of Westminster Cathedral; currently Organist of the Brompton Oratory, London)
- Adam Mathias 2011–2012 (afterwards Organ Scholar of Emmanuel College, Cambridge)
- Joseph Beech 2012–2013 (afterwards studied organ at the Royal Academy of Music, London, whilst Organ scholar of Brompton Oratory and then St Paul's Cathedral; Assistant Master of the Music, St Mary's Cathedral, Edinburgh; currently Sub-Organist, Durham Cathedral)
- Glen Dempsey 2013–2014 (afterwards Organ Scholar of St John's College, Cambridge; currently Assistant Director of Music, Ely Cathedral)
- Alexander Hamilton 2014–2015 (afterwards Organ Scholar of Trinity College, Cambridge then Organ Scholar of Westminster Abbey; currently Assistant Director of Music of Wells Cathedral)
- Asher Oliver 2015–2016 (afterwards Organ Scholar of Trinity College, Cambridge; then Organ Scholar of St Paul's Cathedral)
- Benjamin Newlove 2016–2017 (King's College, University of London; previously Organ Scholar of St Michael's Church, Cornhill and currently at St. Paul’s Church, Knightsbridge)
- Jason Richards 2017–2018 (afterwards Organ Scholar of Jesus College, Cambridge)
- Lucy Morrell 2018–2019 (previously Organ Scholar of Girton College, Cambridge; afterwards Organ Scholar of St Mary’s Collegiate Church, Warwick)
- Emily India Evans 2019–2020 (afterwards Organ Scholar of Sidney Sussex College, Cambridge)
- Alexander Trigg 2020–2021 (afterwards Organ Scholar of St John's College, Cambridge)
- Alex Robson 2021–2022 (afterwards Organ Scholar of St John's College, Cambridge; then Organ Scholar of Westminster Cathedral)
- Miriam Reveley 2022–2023 (currently Organ Scholar of Jesus College, Cambridge)
- Drew Sellis 2023–2024 (previously Organ Scholar of Jesus College, Cambridge; currently Assistant Organist and Tutor to the Choristers of Magdalen College, Oxford)
- Hamish Wagstaff 2024–2025 (previously Organ Scholar of All Saints, Margaret Street; afterwards Organ Scholar of St Paul's Cathedral; currently Assisting Organist of King's College, Cambridge )
- Thomas Watkin 2025–2026 (currently Organ Scholar of St John's College, Cambridge )
- Callum Knox 2026-2027

== Notable alumni ==
- Michael Chance, countertenor
- Sir Henry Walford Davies, composer and noted speaker and broadcaster on music
- David Fanshawe, classical composer
- Francis Grier, classical composer
- Sir William Henry Harris, composer of church music
- John Lubbock, conductor
- Sir Arthur Sullivan, composer
- Robin Blaze, countertenor
- Jeremy Filsell, organist; Director of Music at Saint Thomas Fifth Avenue

== See also ==
- Anglican church music
- St George's Chapel at Windsor Castle
