= David Turner =

David or Dave Turner may refer to:

== Politicians ==
- David M. Turner (1917–2012), member of the Pennsylvania House of Representatives
- David Turner (politician) (born 1944), Canadian politician and academic
- David Howell Turner (1885–1957), politician from Alabama

== Scientists ==
- David W. Turner (born 1927), British physical chemist
- David G. Turner (born 1945), Canadian astronomer
- David H. Turner (born 1941), anthropologist at the University of Toronto
- David Turner (computer scientist) (1946–2023), British computer scientist

== Sportsmen ==
- David Turner (rower) (1923–2015), American rower and Olympic gold medalist
- David Turner (cricketer) (born 1949), Hampshire cricketer
- Deacon Turner (David L. Turner, 1955–2011), former American football running back
- David Turner (Canadian football) (born 1967), defensive back and kick returner
- Dave Turner (soccer, born 1903) (1903–1989), Canadian soccer player
- Dave Turner (footballer, born 1943) (born 1943), English midfielder for Brighton & Hove Albion, coach in Canada
- Dave Turner (footballer, born 1948) (born 1948), English full back for Southport

== Fictional characters ==
- Dave Turner (Degrassi), fictional character in the Canadian teen drama Degrassi: The Next Generation
- David Turner (Neighbours), fictional character on the Australian soap opera Neighbours

== Other people ==
- David Turner, co-author of software development library FreeType released in 1996
- David Turner (businessman), Australian businessman, chairman of Commonwealth Bank 2010–2016
- David Turner (dramatist) (1927–1990), British dramatist
- David Turner (journalist) (born 1965), British businessman in publishing
- David B. Turner, who attempted a murder-suicide at Dow High School, Michigan, in 2007
