= List of Old Mancunians =

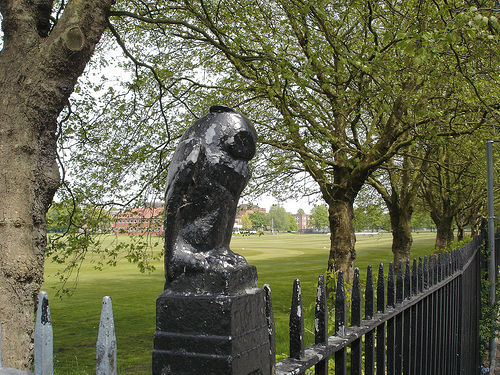
Owls on every post along the school's playing fields fence.

This is a List of Old Mancunians, former pupils of the Manchester Grammar School, in Manchester, England.

== Scientists ==
- Sir James Baddiley FRS FRSE (1918–2008), biochemist
- Michael Barber FRS (1934–1991), chemist and mass spectrometrist
- Peter Phillips Bedson (1883–1943), chemistry professor
- Norman Bleehen CBE FRCR FRCP (b. 1930), oncologist
- Sir Walter Bodmer FRS (b. 1936), geneticist
- Herbert Brereton Baker (1862–1935), inorganic chemist
- Stephen Furber FRS CBE (b. 1953), computer scientist
- Frederick William Gamble FRS (1869–1926), zoologist
- David Ish-Horowicz FRS (1948–2024), developmental biologist
- Frederic Kipping (1863–1949), discoverer of silicon polymers, studied at the University of Manchester
- Laurence Pearl FRS (b. 1956), structural biologist and biochemist
- John Polanyi FRS (b. 1929), chemist awarded the Nobel Prize for Chemistry in 1986
- Merton Sandler (1926–2014), professor of chemical pathology and pioneer in biological psychiatry
- Sir Algernon Thomas FRSNZ KCMG (1857–1937), professor of natural history, Auckland University College (1883–1913)

== Mathematicians ==
- Sir Michael Francis Atiyah (1929–2019), geometer who studied at the school for two years as preparation for Cambridge
- Henry Clarke (1743–1818), mathematics teacher in Manchester, Salford and Liverpool
- Clifford Cocks (b. 1950) mathematician and cryptographer at GCHQ
- Jonathan Mestel (b. 1957), applied mathematician at Imperial College who works on magnetohydrodynamics and biological fluid dynamics
- John Frankland Rigby (1933–2014), academic at Cardiff University, a specialist in complex analysis
- Edmund Taylor Whittaker (1873–1956), went on to study at Trinity settling at Edinburgh to make significant contributions to mathematical physics
- Malcolm J. Williamson (1950–2015), mathematician and cryptographer at GCHQ

== Politicians ==
=== Members of Parliament ===
- Frank Allaun (1913–2002), MP for Salford East 1955–1983
- Richard Pepper Arden, 1st Baron Alvanley (1744–1804), Master of the Rolls 1788–1790 and MP for Hastings 1790–1794
- Den Dover (b. 1938), Conservative MP for Chorley 1979–1997
- Stanley Fink, Baron Fink (b. 1957), hedge fund manager and Life Peer, appointed in 2011
- Neil Gerrard (b. 1942), MP for Walthamstow 1992–2010
- John Leech (b. 1971), MP for Manchester Withington 2005–2015 and councillor for Didsbury West since 2016
- Harold Lever (1914–1995), Labour Party politician and Chancellor of the Duchy of Lancaster as well as Paymaster General. He received the Order of Merit
- Sir Frank Lockwood Q.C. (1846–1897), Liberal Member of Parliament for York 1885–1897 and Solicitor General in 1894
- Frederick Marquis, 1st Earl of Woolton (1883–1964), chairman of the Conservative Party 1946–1955
- Tom Normanton (1917–1997), MP for Cheadle 1970–1987
- Alex Norris (b. 1984), MP for Nottingham North elected in 2017
- Jeff Smith (b. 1963), MP for Manchester Withington since 2015
- Michael Winstanley (1918–1993), MP for Cheadle 1966–1970 and for Hazel Grove in 1974

=== Members of the European Parliament ===
- Den Dover (b. 1938), former MEP for the North West Region 1999–2009

== Cricketers ==
- Michael Atherton (b. 1968), captained the English cricket team 54 times in the mid-1990s
- Mark Chilton (b. 1976), former captain of Lancashire
- John Crawley (b. 1971), former England, Lancashire and Hampshire player
- Mark Lawrence (1962–2010), former Oxford University player
- Gordon McKinna (1930–2007), former Oxford University and Combined Services player
- Scott Richardson (b. 1977), former Yorkshire player
- Gary Yates (b. 1967), former player and Second Team coach for Lancashire

== Writers ==
- Donald Adamson (1939–2024), Fellow of the Royal Society of Literature, historian and biographer
- William Harrison Ainsworth (1805–1882), author of popular historical romances
- Samuel Ogden Andrew (1868–1952), headmaster, translator of Homer, and Old English scholar
- Robert Bolt (1924–1995), playwright; mostly remembered for A Man for All Seasons, for which he received one of his two Academy Awards
- Harold Brighouse (1882–1958), novelist and playwright; together with Stanley Houghton and Allan Monkhouse a member of the Manchester School of early 20th-century dramatists. Author of Hobson's Choice
- Gilbert Cannan (1884–1955), novelist and translator
- Brian Clegg (b. 1955), author of popular science books
- Henry Winram Dickinson (1870–1952), engineering historian and biographer of engineers
- Alan Garner (b. 1934), children's author after whom the school's Junior Library is named
- Paul Harrison (b. 1945), founder of the World Pantheist Movement. Award-winning author of six books on environment and world poverty including the international bestseller Inside the Third World (Penguin 1979–1993)
- Thomas Kibble Hervey (1799–1859), poet and critic
- Stanley Houghton (1881–1913), playwright; together with Harold Brighouse and Allan Monkhouse a member of the Manchester School of early 20th-century dramatists. Hindle Wakes is his best-known play
- Thomas Tendron Jeans (1871–1938), a Royal Navy medical officer who wrote juvenile fiction to show boys what life in the modern navy was really like
- Stephen Leather (b. 1956), thriller writer
- Lawrence Lever (b. 1957), journalist and editor for The Times. Founder of Citywire
- Frank McEachran (1900–1975), translator and writer on philosophy
- Lance Parkin (b. 1971), author and scriptwriter
- Thomas de Quincey (1785–1859), author and intellectual
- Derek Senior (1912–1988), planning correspondent for the Manchester Guardian
- Martin Sixsmith (b. 1954), author, journalist and radio/television presenter
- Guy Thorne, pseudonym of Cyril Arthur Edward Justice Waggoner Ranger Gull (1875–1923), journalist and novelist
- Michael Wood (b. 1948), Fellow of the Royal Historical Society and broadcaster

== Musicians ==
- Graham Clark (b. 1959), improvising violinist
- Greg Morris (b. 1976), assistant organist at Temple Church and conductor
- John Ogdon (1937–1989), pianist

== Military ==
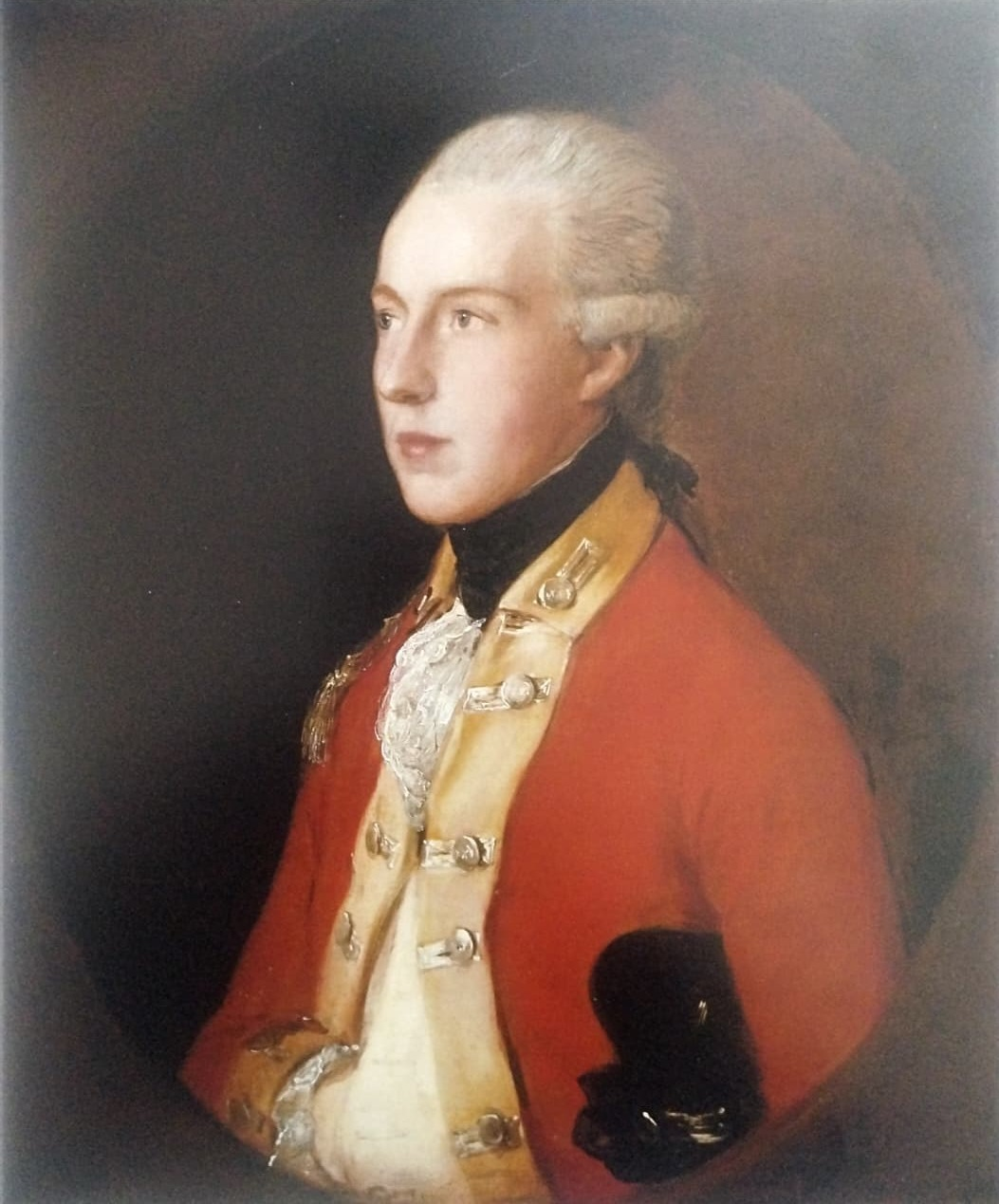
Portrait of Captain John Stanley (1776) by Thomas Gainsborough

Captain John Stanley (1750-1783) who was aide-de-camp to General John Burgoyne during the American War of Independence was also educated at the school.

== Others ==
Poster for a dramatic performance from 1920 featuring actor George Coulouris; his stage debut

- Academic Alan Bookbinder (b. 1956), administrator and, latterly, Master of Downing College
- Actors George Coulouris (1903–1989), Sir Ben Kingsley (b. 1943), Robert Powell (b. 1944) and Ashley Margolis (b. 1993)
- Artists Thomas Cantrell Dugdale (1880–1952), and John Mansbridge (1901–1981), World War II official war artist and Head of Fine Art at Goldsmiths College
- Arts manager Alex Beard (b. 1963)
- Aviator Howard Pixton (1885–1972), winner of the 1914 Schneider Trophy
- Barrister and Alderman of the City of London, Simon Walsh (b. 1962)
- Broadcasters James H. Reeve (b. 1950), and Mark Chapman (b. 1973)
- Civil servant John Swanwick Bradbury, 1st Baron Bradbury (1872–1950)
- Chief executive of Arsenal Football Club, Ivan Gazidis (b. 1964)
- Classical scholar A. A. Long (b. 1937)
- Clergyman and politician, Rev. Joseph Diggle (1849–1917)
- Comedian Chris Addison (b. 1971)
- Diplomats Sir John Hanson (1938–2017) and Leigh Turner (b. 1958)
- Diplomat and British Ambassador to Brazil 1977-79, Sir Norman Statham (1922-2001)
- Director of the London School of Economics and former chairman of the Financial Services Authority, Lord Davies (b. 1951)
- Doctors Rangan Chatterjee (b. 1977), and David Oliver (b. 1966). Former Older Peoples Tsar in the Department of Health, president of British Geriatrics Society. Senior visiting fellow at the King's Fund, professor at City University, London
- Economist Paul Ormerod (b. 1950)
- Entrepreneur and adviser Sacha Lord (b. 1972)
- Fashion designer, theatrical director and stylist William Baker (b. 1973), known for his work with Kylie Minogue
- Footballer Oliver Gill (b. 1990)
- Headmaster of Tonbridge School and Harrow School, Joseph Wood (1841–1923)
- Historian Victor G Kiernan (1913–2009)
- Richard Hollins Murray, inventor of the reflective lens (the inspiration for cat's eyes used in road markings), owner and restorer of Dinmore Manor, Herefordshire
- Journalists Dominic Carman (b. 1961), Michael Crick (b. 1958), Faisal Islam (b. 1977), Alexander Gault MacGowan (1894–1970), Tim Samuels (b. 1975) and Jim White (b. 1957)
- Judges Sir Robert Booth (1626–1681) and Sir Charles Mantell (1937–2010)
- Master of University College, Oxford, Sir Ivor Martin Crewe (b. 1945)
- Musicologist, critic and actor Christopher Webber (b. 1953)
- Opera and theatre director Steven Pimlott (1953–2007)
- Poet Samuel Bamford (1788–1872)
- President of the Hebrew University of Jerusalem, Leon Simon (1881–1965)
- Principal of King's College London, Sir Ernest Barker (1874–1960)
- Principal of Brasenose College, classical scholar Alan Bowman (b. 1944)
- Psychologist and philosopher Daniel Berlyne (1924–1976)
- Theatre and film director Nicholas Hytner (b. 1956)
- Theatre director and Shakespearian academic Ben Iden Payne (1881–1976)
- Vice-chancellor of the University of York, Professor Brian Cantor (b. 1948)
- Victoria Cross recipient, William Thomas Forshaw (1890–1943) was a teacher at the school
- Geoffrey Masterman Wilson (1910–2004), barrister and civil servant, chairman of the Race Relations Board and Oxfam
