= Clifford Gundle =

South African entrepreneur and philanthropist

- Born: 7 February 1936 (age 90); South Africa
- Occupations: Entrepreneur, investor, philanthropist
- Known for: Founder of Gundle Plastics Group
- Spouse: Sooozee Gundle
- Children: 4

Clifford Gundle (born 7 February 1936) is a South African-British entrepreneur, investor and philanthropist. He is the founder of Gundle Plastics, one of the largest flexible film plastics manufacturers in the southern hemisphere, and co-founder of Aurum Fund Management, a hedge fund manager.

== Career ==
=== South Africa ===
In 1959, Gundle founded Gundle Plastics in Johannesburg, South Africa. The company's first flexible pond lining was installed in 1966, consisting of a stabilised polyethylene membrane that Gundle invented and branded as GUNDLINE. In 1966, he established what would become Aquatan Lining Systems as part of the Gundle Plastics Group.

In 1984, Gundle sold Gundle Plastics to AECI for R28 million, retaining his stake in Aquatan (formerly Gundle Linings), which continued to operate under its own name. The company went public in 1986. Growth accelerated after South African government regulations required double lining for hazardous waste containment.

Other companies Gundle founded or acquired in South Africa include SA Umbrella Manufacturers, Barrier Coatings, Concord Cupboards and Kermac Tarpaulin Manufacturers. He also established office and kitchen furniture manufacturing companies within B & S Engineering (subsequently Furntech Group), which became quoted on the Johannesburg Stock Exchange.

=== United States ===
In 1979, Gundle founded Gundle Environmental Systems in Houston, Texas, which specialised in manufacturing and installing impervious plastic membranes for the containment of hazardous wastes. The company was subsequently listed on the American Stock Exchange. In 1995, Gundle Environmental Systems merged with SLT Environmental Inc. to form Gundle/SLT Environmental Inc.

Together with partners, Gundle acquired Naltex Netting, a non-woven plastic net extrusion company, as well as American White Cross, a private-label medical products company that was quoted on NASDAQ.

=== United Kingdom ===
In the United Kingdom, Gundle founded or established several companies with partners, including Inpace, a computer accessory company; Innovative Technologies, a medical product manufacturer listed on the London Stock Exchange; and Zedcor, a manufacturer of waterproof sheeting for the construction industry.

In 1994, he co-founded Knightsbridge Information Services, an economic data research company, and Aurum Fund Management, a hedge fund manager whose funds are quoted on the Bermuda and Irish Stock Exchanges. Aurum was founded by the Sweidan and Gundle families with an initial $16 million under management and an emphasis on capital preservation. The firm has grown to manage over $6 billion in assets.

In 1998, Gundle was a founding partner in establishing Citywire, an internet financial news service and financial publishing business. Reuters purchased a minority stake in the company in 2001.

== Philanthropy ==
Gundle has made significant charitable donations, including:

- Patron of the London Jewish Cultural Centre
- Patron of the National Theatre
- Patron of the Cameri Theatre, Tel Aviv
- Supporter of the Victoria and Albert Museum
- Donor to the Courtauld Institute of Art
- Member of the Dean's Council at Harvard Kennedy School
- Donor to British ORT

== Personal life ==
Gundle is married to Sooozee Gundle, with whom he has four children. His son Kevin Gundle is the CEO of Aurum Funds Limited.
