= Lawrence Lever =

- Born: July 1957
- Citizenship: British
- Education: Manchester Grammar School
- Alma mater: Brasenose College, Oxford University
- Occupation: Chairman
- Organization: Citywire
- Notable work: The Barlow Clowes Affair

Lawrence Lever is a journalist and entrepreneur, best known for his work investigating The Barlow Clowes Affair.

== Education ==
Lawrence Lever was educated at Manchester Grammar School, and went on to study law at Brasenose College in Oxford University. After earning his degree, he decided not to pursue law, but instead chose a career in journalism.

== Career ==
Lever joined The Times in 1985 although he originally began his career as a trained and qualified solicitor. In the 1990s he changed his career towards journalism.

Lever was notable for his work in the publication of an investigative journalism piece about Barlow Clowes. He gained his knowledge and research whilst working as the assistant editor of The Times, later gaining a position as an editor of the Mail On Sunday. He helped to shed light to the crimes committed by Clowes in the City of London, as well as providing an insight into the childhood life of Clowes and his rise. His discoveries and research were collected into a single book, The Barlow Clowes Affair.

Lever went on to leave the newspaper publishing business to start up Citywire with Richard Lander and David Turner in 1999, dedicated to providing consumer and professional financial information. With experience in financial editing, Lever oversaw the creation of Citywire's first industry magazine.

== Private life ==
Lawrence is married to Karen, who is a Child and Adolescent Psychotherapist and a Family Counsellor. They have three children.

== See also ==
- List of people from London
