= Daniel Joseph Wood =

English organist

Daniel Joseph Wood, 1849 - 1919 FRCO 1873; was an English organist.

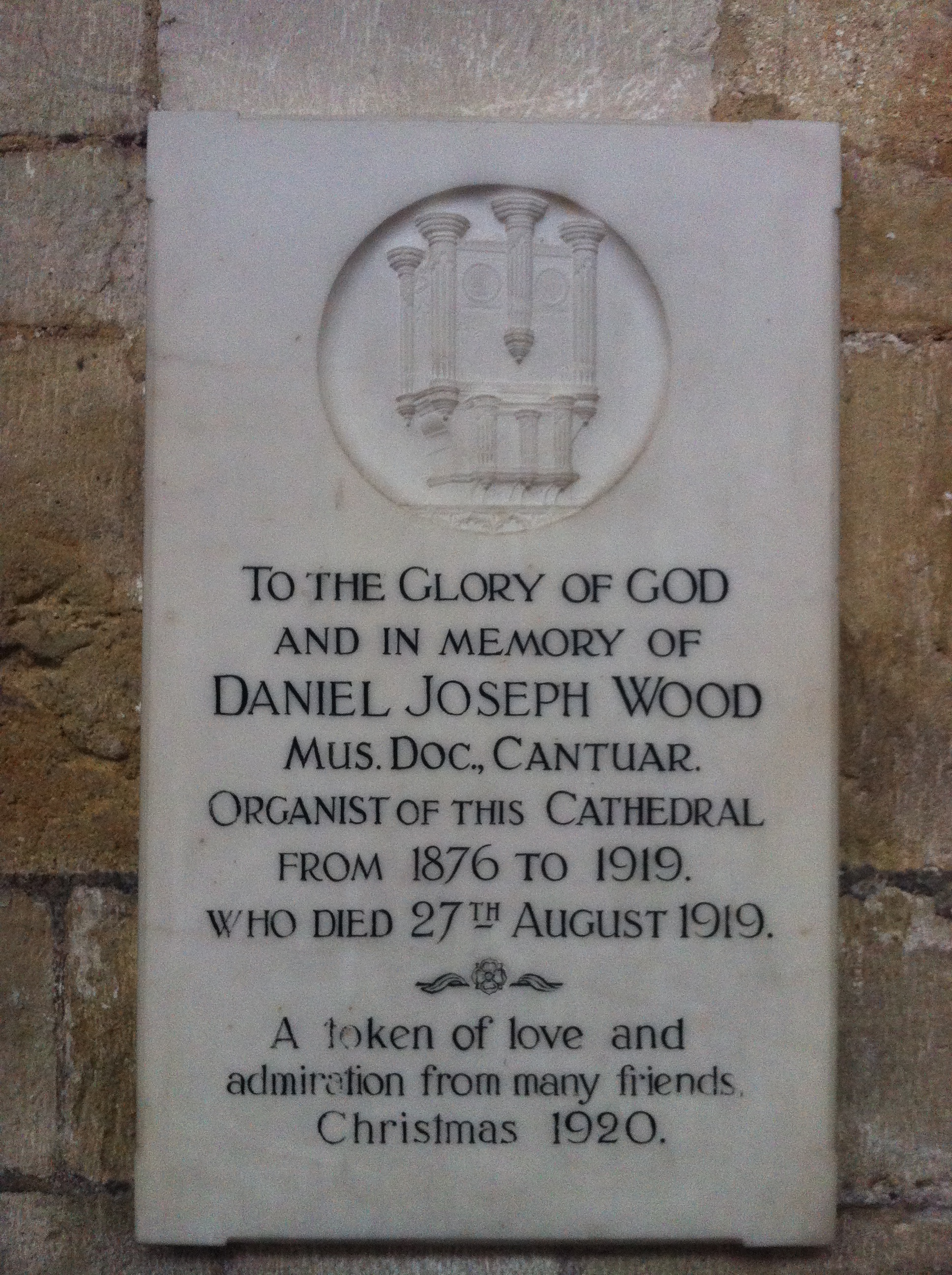
Memorial in Exeter Cathedral

Daniel Wood was a chorister and pupil of J. L. Hopkins at Rochester. He came to Chichester after six years as Organist of Boston Parish Church, Lincs., and followed the then current fashion of a short stay as Organist of Chichester Cathedral, before moving to Exeter Cathedral where he was Organist from 1876 to 1919.

== Sources ==
- Brown, James Duff and Stephen Samuel Stratton. British Musical Biography page 455. S.S. Stratton. 1897. (ex Harvard University) Digitized October 25, 2007. Online. January 20, 2009.

Cultural offices
Preceded by Charles Henry Hylton Stewart	Organist and Master of the Choristers of Chichester Cathedral; 1875-1876	Succeeded by Theodore Aylward
Preceded by Alfred Angel	Organist and Master of the Choristers of Exeter Cathedral; 1876-1919	Succeeded by Ernest Bullock
