= William Henry Harris =

English organist and composer (1883–1973)

Sir William Henry Harris KCVO
- Harris in 1944
- Born: 28 March 1883; Fulham, London, England
- Died: 6 September 1973 (aged 90); Petersfield, Hampshire, England
- Education: Royal College of Music
- Occupations: Composer; organist
- Years active: 1911–1961
- Era: 20th century
- Spouse: Kathleen Doris Carter (m. 1913; died 1968)
- Children: 2

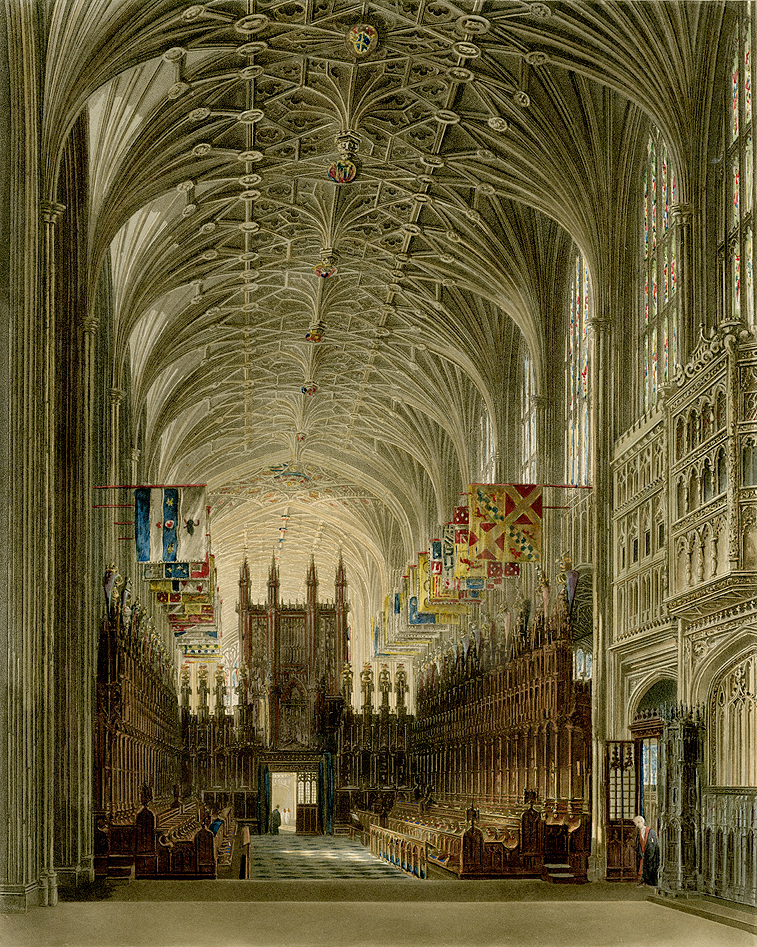
View of the choir and organ in St. George's Chapel, Windsor Castle, where "Doc" Harris served as organist and choirmaster

Sir William Henry Harris KCVO (28 March 1883 – 6 September 1973) was an English organist, choral trainer and composer.

== Early life and education ==
Harris was born in Fulham, London and became a chorister at Holy Trinity, Tulse Hill. At the age of 14, he took up a "flexible" position as assistant organist at St David's Cathedral in Wales under Herbert Morris, followed at 16 by a scholarship to the Royal College of Music, where his teachers were Sir Walter Parratt, Charles Wood, and Henry Walford Davies.

== Career ==
Harris was organist at St Augustine's Church, Edgbaston from 1911 to 1919 and concurrently assistant organist at Lichfield Cathedral. During this time he also taught at the Royal Birmingham Conservatoire in collaboration with Granville Bantock. A move to Oxford in 1919 saw him take up organist positions successively at New College and in 1929 Christ Church, Oxford. While at Oxford, he conducted the Oxford Bach Choir (1925–1933) and was instrumental in founding and conducting the Opera Club, which put on the pioneering production of Monteverdi's Orfeo staged by Jack Westrup in 1925. In 1933 he was appointed organist at St George's Chapel, Windsor in succession to Charles Hylton Stewart. There, he was at his most productive, composing for the Three Choirs Festival, conducting at both the 1937 and 1953 coronations and producing two orchestral pieces premiered at The Proms: the overture Once Upon a Time (1940) and the Heroic Prelude (1942).

Bruce Nightingale, who became senior chorister at Windsor during the wartime years, describes "Doc H" as having "a fat, usually jolly face with a few wisps of hair across an otherwise bald head." Although choir practice was normally conducted in a "benign atmosphere," Nightingale recounts that Harris would occasionally complain of a "batey practise" and, on the rare occasions he considered a performance mediocre, would scold the choirboys in a loud stage whisper from the organ loft. Harris was involved in the musical education of the teenage Princesses Elizabeth and Margaret Rose, who spent the wartime period at Windsor Castle. Every Monday he would direct madrigal practice in the Red Drawing Room at Windsor, where the two Princesses sang alongside four of the senior choristers with the lower voices augmented by Etonians, Grenadier Guards and members of the Windsor and Eton Choral Society. Jars of Argentinian honey, sent to Windsor by overseas subjects, were donated by the Princesses to the Choir School as a treat for the choristers.

Between 1923 and 1953 Harris served as a professor of organ and harmony in the Royal College of Music. He was also president of the Royal College of Organists (1946–48), and director of musical studies at the Royal School of Church Music (1956–61). He was appointed KCVO in 1954.

== Compositions ==
Harris is best remembered today for his Anglican church music, though during his lifetime he was mainly known for his achievements as a choir-trainer. His most famous works are two anthems for unaccompanied double choir: Faire is the heaven (1925), a setting of Edmund Spenser's poem "An Hymne of Heavenly Beautie"; and Bring us, O Lord God, a setting of a prayer in a Sermon (29th February 1628) by John Donne first heard in Windsor on 29 October 1959, and which was sung at the Committal Service of Queen Elizabeth II at St George's Chapel, Windsor Castle on 19 September 2022.

Another popular anthem by Harris is Strengthen ye the weak hands (1949) for choir and organ. The late anthem Evening Hymn (1961), a setting of Thomas Browne's 'The Night is Come', is particularly notable for its intense and expressive ending (on the words 'when I shall never sleep again, but wake forever') set "in a cool, clear C major with the hint of a sharpened fourth". His Communion Service in F was frequently sung in a great many Anglican parish churches up until the 1970s. The canticles Harris in A and Harris in A minor are still sung at Evensong in a number of Anglican cathedrals. The hymn tune Alberta (often used for the words Lead, Kindly Light), and various Anglican psalm chants remain familiar, as does his tune North Petherton for the hymn Come Down, O Love Divine.

Harris also composed cantatas and organ pieces. His largest composition, the 1919 choral-orchestral cantata The Hound of Heaven (a setting of the religious allegory by Francis Thompson), has been almost completely forgotten. A second cantata, Michael Angelo's Confession of Faith (to a poem by Morna Stuart, after Wordsworth), was composed for the Three Choirs Festival in 1935. The organ works span seventy-four years, from the 1899 Andante in D to the Prelude in G (1973), which was later played at the funeral of the Princess of Wales. Most of the organ pieces are miniatures, with the exception of the Organ Sonata (1938) and the two complex Fantasias on "Babylon Streams" (1922) and "Monks Gate" (1930).

== Personal life and death ==
Harris married Kathleen Doris Carter in 1913 and they had two daughters. After retirement from St George's Windsor in 1961 the couple went to live in Petersfield, Hampshire. Kathleen had suffered from deafness since 1925, but in the early 1960s her hearing was partially restored. She died in 1968. Harris died at the age of 90 five years later.

Cultural offices
Preceded by Hugh Allen	Organist and Master of the Choristers of New College, Oxford; 1919-1929	Succeeded by John Dykes Bower
Preceded by Noel Ponsonby	Organist and Master of the Choristers of Christ Church Cathedral, Oxford; 1929–1933	Succeeded by Thomas Armstrong
Preceded by Charles Hylton Stewart	Director of Music, St George's Chapel, Windsor Castle; 1933-1961	Succeeded by Sidney Campbell
