= Charles Henry Hylton Stewart =

English clergyman and organist

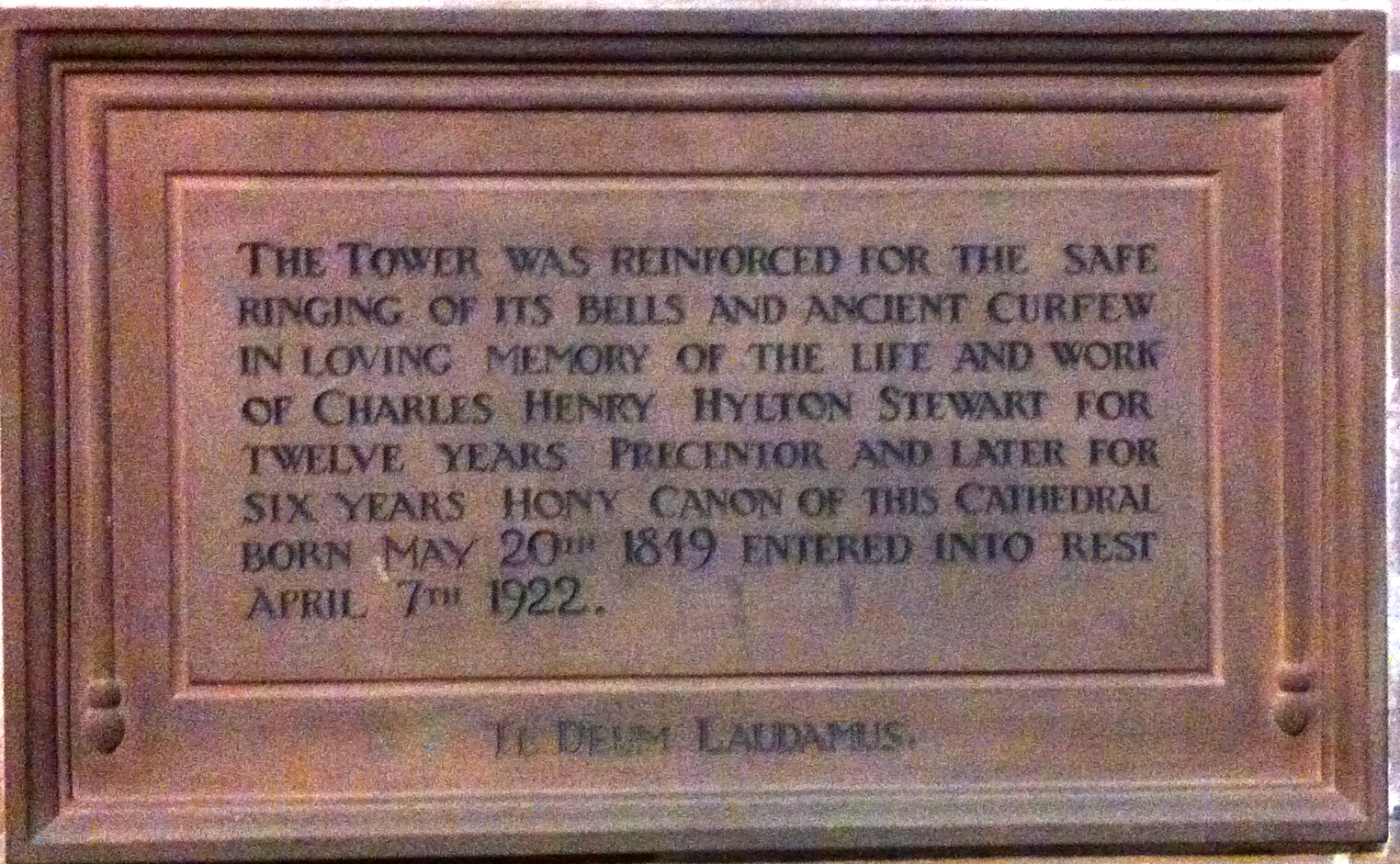
Memorial to Charles Henry Hylton Stewart in Chester Cathedral

Charles Henry Hylton Stewart (1849–1922) was an English clergyman and organist.

== Education and career ==
=== Organist ===
Stewart was educated in Bath, Somerset, before entering Christ's College, Cambridge, in 1870. Migrating to St Catharine's College in 1871, where he was choral scholar and organist, he was awarded a B.A. in 1874 and an M.A. in 1877. He served briefly as organist of Chichester Cathedral from 1874 to 1875.

=== Clergyman ===
Steward left his position at Chichester Cathedral to take holy orders and was ordained a deacon by the Bishop of Rochester in 1875 and a priest the following year. After serving as curate of Pebmarsh in Essex (1875−1877), he was a minor canon, precentor and sacristan of Chester Cathedral (1877−1889), vicar of New Brighton in Cheshire (1889–1904), and rector of Bathwick with Woolley in Somerset (1904–1916). He later served as an honorary canon of Chester from 1916 until his death.

== Family ==
Stewart married Florence Hope Dixon, the daughter of Thomas Dixon, a banker in Chester, and was the father of:

- Arthur Charles Lestoc Hylton Stewart (1884−1932), known as Charles Hylton Stewart, organist and composer
- Bruce de la Coeur Hylton-Stewart (1891−1972), musician and cricketer

Cultural offices
Preceded by James Pyne	Organist and Master of the Choristers of Chichester Cathedral; 1874-1875	Succeeded by Daniel Wood
