= Robert Ashfield =

British musician

Robert Ashfield (28 July 1911 – 30 December 2006) was an English cathedral organist, choirmaster and composer.

== Early life and education ==
Robert James Ashfield was born in 1911 at Chipstead, Surrey. Educated at Tonbridge School and the Royal College of Music (RCM), he inherited his considerable musical talent from his mother, a fine amateur musician. At the RCM he was taught and inspired by Sir Ernest Bullock, then organist of Westminster Abbey, and became his assistant.

Ashfield became a Fellow of the Royal College of Organists in 1932, and then served as organist of St John's, Smith Square, London, from 1934 until 1941. After being awarded his doctorate by the University of London in 1941, he served in the Army during the Second World War.

== Southwell ==
After his war service, he was, in 1946, appointed "magister and rector chori" at Southwell Minster. Here he was fortunate in receiving the full support of the Provost, Hugh Heywood. He began by establishing a regular and disciplined rehearsal routine, and before long the choir was known for its bold and incisive sound. Ashfield also increased the range of choral repertoire performed, and expanded other areas of musical life within the cathedral. He also edited and compiled the "Southwell Psalter", a setting of each of the 150 Psalms to Anglican chant, which is still used at both Southwell and New College, Oxford.

== Rochester ==
After 10 years at Southwell, he moved to Rochester Cathedral in 1956 as organist and master of the choristers. Over the next 21 years he also made his mark on the local community, notably as conductor of the Rochester Choral Society. From 1958 until 1977, he also taught at the RCM.

His arrival at Rochester coincided with the opportunity to redesign and completely rebuild the cathedral organ. In consultation with the organ builders, J. W. Walker & Sons Ltd, Ashfield rejected much of the piecemeal work that had gone before producing, in 1960, an instrument with a traditional feel but well-suited to the needs of the cathedral.

He retired from his cathedral post in 1977, but remained in Rochester until his death in December 2006.

== Composition ==
His practical experience of the liturgy allowed him to write well for voices. Many of his anthems, services, responses, chants and other choral works, often written for special occasions, have retained their place in the repertoire. perhaps best known is his setting of Lionel Johnson's 1895 poem, The Fair Chivalry, commissioned for the Southwell Diocesan Choral Festival of 1949.

Following his retirement, his compositional output increased due to the greater amount of time he could commit to it. To an already large set of works was added much chamber music, an opera, The Bishop's Candlestick, and many instrumental pieces.

Of all the compositions, his own favourite remained a setting of Robert Bridges's Christmas Eve, commissioned by David Poulter and the Tudor Consort for voices and a chamber ensemble including harp, flute, oboe and string quartet.

== Administrative influence ==
In the late 1960s, relations between clergy and musicians in the Church of England became increasingly strained over the question of fees and salaries. Ashfield represented the Royal College of Organists, working initially in partnership with William Cole, of the Associated Board, and Gerald Knight, director of the Royal School of Church Music, he helped to provide a series of recommendations. However, following delays in their acceptance, Ashfield unilaterally produced his own suggested set of fees. Subsequently championed by The Church Times, the Ashfield Scale, as it became known, stayed in vogue throughout the decade.

He was also a member of the council of the Royal College of Organists, Fellow of the Guild of Church Musicians and a special commissioner of the Royal School of Church Music.

Cultural offices
Preceded by George Francis	Rector Chori of Southwell Minster; 1946–1956	Succeeded by David Lumsden
Preceded by Harold Bennett	Organist and Master of the Choristers of Rochester Cathedral; 1956–1977	Succeeded by Barry Ferguson
