= Timothy Byram-Wigfield =

English organist and conductor

Timothy Byram-Wigfield, born 15 September 1963, is an English organist and conductor.

Timothy Byram-Wigfield was a chorister at King's College, Cambridge under David Willcocks and Philip Ledger. Following study at the Royal College of Music as organist, pianist and violist, he became organ scholar at Christ Church, Oxford, sub-organist at Winchester Cathedral, becoming Master of the Music at St Mary's Cathedral, Edinburgh (Episcopal) in 1991. In 1999 he took up the new post of Director of Music at Jesus College, Cambridge and in 2004 was appointed Director of Music at St George's Chapel, Windsor Castle.

From 1993–1998 he trained the Scottish Chamber Orchestra Chorus and from 1999 he was Conductor of the Northampton Bach Choir. In 2008 he was appointed Associate Conductor of the Oxford Bach Choir.

He also teaches the organ and the piano at Eton College.

In 2013, he was appointed Director of Music at All Saints, Margaret Street, in succession to Paul Brough. He departed from this post in November 2018.

== Recordings ==
=== Organ ===
- 2009 – Messiaen: Complete Organ Works Vol 4
- 2007 - The Kelvingrove Organ
- 2007 – Hollins Organ Works
- 2006 – Messiaen: Les Corps Glorieux
- 2006 – A Windsor Collection
- 2002 – A Land of Pure Delight (RSCM Millennium Youth Choir)
- 2000 – Twelve Organs of Edinburgh
- 1995 – The Organ of St Mary's Cathedral, Edinburgh
- 1994 - Weelkes: Cathedral Music Anthems Vol 10 (Winchester Cathedral Choir, David Hill)
- 1993 – Tallis: Sacred Choral Works (Winchester Cathedral Choir, Winchester Quiristers, David Hill)
- 1991 – Jerusalem (Winchester Cathedral Choir, David Hill)

=== Conducting ===
- 2009 – The Lamentations of Jeremiah (Lay Clerks of St George's Chapel Windsor)
- 2006 - O How Glorious is the Kingdom (Choir of St George's Chapel Windsor, Roger Judd)
- 2005 – Abide with Me and Other Favourite Hymns (Marlowe Brass Ensemble, Choir of St George's Chapel Windsor)

Cultural offices
Preceded by Jonathan Rees-Williams	Director of Music, St George's Chapel, Windsor Castle; 2004-2013	Succeeded by James Vivian
