= James Kendrick Pyne =

English organist and composer

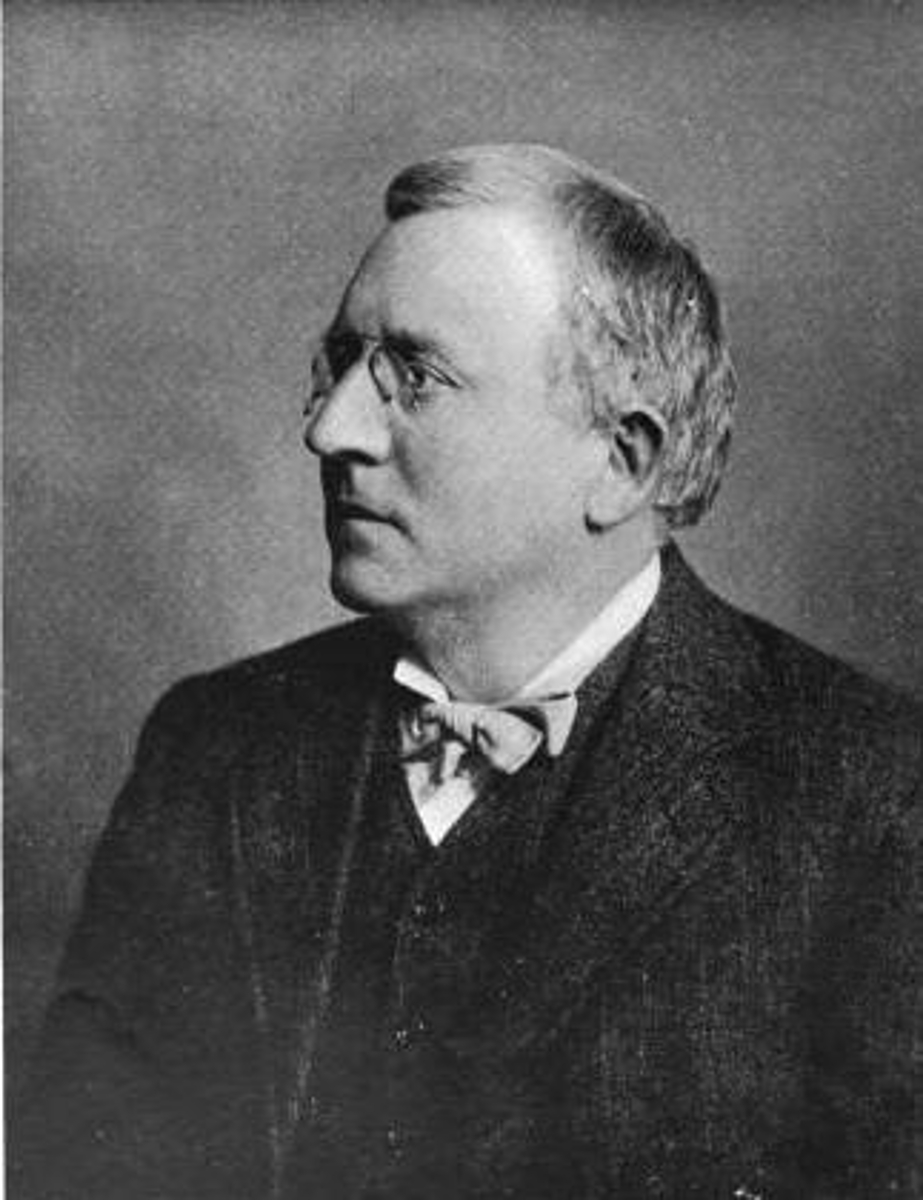
James Kendrick Pyne

James Kendrick Pyne (5 February 1852 – 3 September 1938) was an English organist and composer.

== Biography ==
He was born in Bath into a musical family. His father, also James Kendrick Pyne (1810–1893) was an organist at Bath Abbey for 53 years and his grandfather, also James Kendrick Pyne (1788–1857) was a tenor. His great uncle George Pyne was an alto singer, and George Pyne's daughters Susan and Louisa Pyne were both accomplished singers. By the age of 11 he was the organist at All Saints' Church, Bath. At the age of 12 his father sent him to study with Samuel Sebastian Wesley, organist at Winchester and later Gloucester Cathedral.

In 1873 he became an organist at Chichester Cathedral. In 1874 he went to the United States to become an organist at St. Mark's, Philadelphia. A year later Pyne returned to England to Manchester where he would become a leading figure in the musical life of the city. He took over the organist position at Manchester Cathedral and later became the organist for the City Corporation. In 1893 he was appointed professor of the organ at the Royal Manchester College of Music and became Dean of the Faculty of Music in 1908. He lived at Milverton Lodge, on Anson Road in Victoria Park, Manchester. He retired from work at the cathedral in 1908 but continued work at the college until 1926 when he retired to Essex where he died in Ilford in 1938.

Kendrick Pyne married Agnes Ireland, the youngest daughter of General Charles Ireland of the Madras Service Corps. The couple had five sons and four daughters.

Pyne's studio 4-manual instrument which was his teaching instrument at the Royal Manchester College of Music is now at St Peter's Collegiate Church in Ruthin, Denbighshire, and was rebuilt by Henry Willis & Sons in 2003.

== Works ==
Compositions include:

- Communion Service in A flat
- Collection of songs setting the poems of Edwin Waugh

== Writings ==
- "Personal recollections of Samuel Sebastian Wesley", English Church Music

Cultural offices
Preceded by Francis Edward Gladstone	Organist and Master of the Choristers of Chichester Cathedral; 1873	Succeeded by Charles Henry Hylton Stewart
Preceded by Frederick Bridge	Organist and Master of the Choristers of Manchester Cathedral; 1875–1908	Succeeded by Sydney Nicholson
