= Bruce Hylton-Stewart =

English musician, schoolteacher, and cricketer

Personal information
- Full name: Bruce de la Coeur Hylton-Stewart
- Born: 27 November 1891; New Brighton, Cheshire, England
- Died: 1 October 1972 (aged 80); Marlborough, Wiltshire, England
- Batting: Right-handed
- Bowling: Right-arm fast-medium
- Role: All-rounder

Domestic team information
- Years: Team
- 1912–1914: Somerset
- FC debut: 17 June 1912 Somerset v South Africans
- Last FC: 1 September 1914 Somerset v Essex

Career statistics
Competition	First-class
Matches	36
Runs scored	1,003
Batting average	17.59
100s/50s	1/2
Top score	110
Balls bowled	2,805
Wickets	58
Bowling average	28.70
5 wickets in innings	2
10 wickets in match	0
Best bowling	5/3
Catches/stumpings	17/–
- Source: CricketArchive, 9 November 2008

Bruce de la Coeur Hylton-Stewart (27 November 1891 – 1 October 1972) was a British cricketer, army officer, schoolteacher and musician.

== Early life and education ==
Hylton-Stewart was born at New Brighton and brought up in Cheshire, where his father Charles Henry Hylton Stewart was a minor canon of Chester Cathedral. He was educated at Bath College, then went up to Peterhouse, Cambridge, on an organ scholarship.

== Career ==
=== Cricketer ===
Hylton-Stewart was a right-handed lower or middle order batsman and a right-arm fast-medium bowler. Between 1912 and 1914 he played first-class cricket for both Somerset County Cricket Club and Cambridge University Cricket Club. His first appearance for Somerset was in a match against the South African national team, when he replaced the injured Harry Chidgey after the game had started. Two weeks later, he made his only appearance of the 1912 season for Cambridge University, and from mid-July appeared fairly regularly for Somerset for the rest of the season. His batting was not successful, but he had one sensational day as a bowler, taking five wickets for three runs in 14 balls against Worcestershire at Stourbridge: these remained the best bowling figures of his first-class cricket career.

In 1913 he played 11 first-class matches, most of them in the second half of the season and all of them for Somerset. He took five wickets in an innings for a second time, this time five for 72 against Yorkshire at Park Avenue, Bradford. His batting improved as well, and he made his first score of more than 50, an unbeaten 72 against Sussex at Bath.

The 1914 season was Hylton-Stewart's most successful as a batsman – he made 520 runs at an average of 20.80 per innings. After two matches for Cambridge in the middle of the season, he again played most of Somerset's matches in the second half of the year. Batting now in the middle order, he achieved his only first-class century (110), made in 105 minutes out of an innings of 220, against Essex at Leyton. Later in the season, he made 91 against Worcestershire at Taunton.

The outbreak of the First World War cut short Hylton-Stewart's first-class cricket career, although he did later play minor counties cricket for Hertfordshire until 1927.

=== Army officer ===
During the First World War Hylton-Stewart was commissioned in the British Army and served with the Officers' Training Corps (OTC), first at The Leys School and then at Haileybury College. He remained with the Haileybury OTC until 1929, when he resigned his commission.

=== Schoolteacher and musician ===
Hylton-Stewart taught at Marlborough College from 1934 to 1954. He then served as organist and director of music at St James's Church, Piccadilly from 1954 to 1970.

He died at Marlborough in 1972 at the age of 80.

== Note on spelling ==
Hylton-Stewart's surname is written without a hyphen in some non-cricketing references, and regularly with a hyphen in cricketing references. The names of both his father and his older brother, the musician Charles Hylton Stewart (1884–1932), are generally written without a hyphen. Furthermore, Hylton-Stewart's middle name is spelled "Delacour" in some references.
