= Harold Aubie Bennett =

English composer and organist

Harold Aubie Bennett FRCO, FTCL, Hon.RCM (30 July 1891 - 4 February 1978) was a composer and organist based in England.

== Life ==
He was born in Eccles, Lancashire in 1891, the son of William Arthur Bennett. He was educated at Leeds Central High School and studied organ under Sir Edward Bairstow at both Leeds Parish Church and York Minster.

He was music master at The King's School, Rochester and the conductor of Rochester Choral Society.

He married Lillian Whittick Dewhurst.

== Appointments ==
- Organist of Holy Trinity, Micklegate from 1915
- Assistant organist at York Minster 1917 - 1923
- Organist at St. George's Church, Doncaster 1923 - 1930
- Organist at Rochester Cathedral 1930 - 1956

== Compositions ==
He wrote a number of compositions.

Cultural offices
Preceded by Charles Hylton Stewart	Organist and Master of the Choristers of Rochester Cathedral; 1930–1956	Succeeded by Robert Ashfield
