= James Vivian =

British organist (born 1974)

James Vivian FRCO (born 1974) is Organist & Director of Music at St George's Chapel, Windsor. In this role, he has been responsible for providing music at many Royal occasions including three Royal Weddings (such as The Duke and Duchess of Sussex, and Princess Eugenie and Mr Jack Brooksbank) and the funerals of Prince Philip, Duke of Edinburgh, and Queen Elizabeth II. In 2022, he directed the music for King Charles III's first Christmas King's Speech.

He was educated as a Music Scholar at Malvern College. He was organ scholar and acting-Assistant Organist of Lincoln Cathedral (1992-3) and was Organ Scholar of King's College, Cambridge (1993-7). He studied the organ with Dr John Bishop, David Sanger, Philip Marshall, Colin Walsh and was awarded a scholarship to study with Marie-Louise Langlais in Paris. He was a prizewinner in the FRCO diploma. In 2013, he became an Honorary Master of the Bench of Middle Temple in recognition of his contribution to the Temple.

From 2006 until 2013, he was Director of Music of the historic Temple Church in London, where he presided over the choir of men and boys. In 2012, he oversaw the complete renovation of the 1924 Harrison & Harrison organ with the organ builders. This work included complete tonal rebalancing, adding six new stops to the Great Organ in the 1920s style, and reverting some of the previous decades' changes back to the original specification.

He has recorded on many labels (including Decca, EMI, Universal, SonyBMG, Hyperion Records, Signum and Priory) and has broadcast and performed concerts worldwide. He has been an examiner for both The Royal College of Organists and The Royal Academy of Music.

He is married to the concert organist, Ann Elise Smoot.

Cultural offices
Preceded by Stephen Layton	Director of Music, Temple Church; 2006–2013	Succeeded by Roger Sayer
Preceded by Timothy Byram-Wigfield	Director of Music, St George's Chapel, Windsor Castle; 2013-	Succeeded by incumbent
