= Reginald Alwyn Surplice =

English organist and composer

Reginald Alwyn Surplice (20 August 1906 – 21 April 1977) was an English organist and composer.

== Life ==
Born at Pangbourne, Berkshire, Surplice studied at the University of Reading under Gustav Holst and was awarded a Bachelor of Music degree from Durham University.

In 1927 he was appointed Assistant Organist at St George's Chapel, Windsor Castle, later serving as Sub-Organist from 1932 to 1945, when he was appointed Organist and Master of the Choristers at Bristol Cathedral. In 1949 he moved to Winchester Cathedral, holding the same office until his retirement in 1971.

Surplice was a Fellow of the Royal College of Organists and taught organ at the Royal Academy of Music. On his retirement, the Archbishop of Canterbury, Michael Ramsey, conferred on him the degree of Doctor of Music.

He died at Winchester at the age of 70.

== Works ==
In addition to the hymn tune "Wessex", he composed psalm settings and anthems in the Anglican choral tradition.

Cultural offices
Preceded by Herbert Hunt	Organist and Master of the Choristers, Bristol Cathedral; 1946-1949	Succeeded by Clifford Harker
Preceded by Harold Rhodes	Organist and Master of the Music, Winchester Cathedral; 1949–1972	Succeeded by Martin Neary
