= Scott Richardson (cricketer) =

English cricketer (born 1977)

Scott Andrew Richardson nickname Tickle (born 5 September 1977, Oldham, Greater Manchester, England) is an English first-class cricketer, who played thirteen first-class matches for Yorkshire County Cricket Club between 2000 and 2003. He also played one List A one day game in 2002 against West Indies. He played for Cumberland in the Minor Counties Cricket Championship from 2004 to 2006 with a top score of 170 not out. He is the first Cumberland cricketer to score 4 hundreds in 4 consecutive games.

A right-handed opening batsman, Richardson scored 377 runs at 17.95, with a top score of 69 against Kent. He also scored 68 against Somerset and 50 against Glamorgan. His right arm medium bowling was not called upon in first-class or List A cricket.

He also appeared for Leicestershire Second XI (1996–1999), Worcestershire Second XI (1996) and the Yorkshire Second XI (2000–2003). More recently he has played his cricket in Bradford League, winning 5 league titles for Woodlands CC and a top score of 180 not out for Baildon CC.

He is the son of Mike Richardson, a league cricket professional for many years in the 1970s and 1980s.
