= Jonathan Rees-Williams =

British cathedral organist (born 1949)

Jonathan Rees-Williams (born 10 February 1949) is a British cathedral organist, who served in Lichfield Cathedral and St. George's Chapel, Windsor Castle.

== Background ==
He was born in St. Helier, Jersey. He studied music at the Royal Academy of Music.

In 2004, he was arrested and in court he admitted five counts of indecent assault involving two boys, but denied a further 10 counts against boys and three against a girl. He was jailed for five years for the indecent assaults and a further three months, to run consecutively, for possessing 127 indecent images of children on two computers.

== Career ==
- Organ scholar at New College, Oxford, 1969–1972
- Acting organist at [New College, Oxford, 1972

Assistant organist:

- Hampstead Parish Church
- St. Clement Danes
- Salisbury Cathedral, 1974–1978

Organist of:

- Lichfield Cathedral, 1978–1991
- St. George's Chapel, Windsor Castle, 1991–2002

Cultural offices
Preceded by Richard Greening	Organist and Master of the Choristers of Lichfield Cathedral; 1978–1991	Succeeded by Andrew Lumsden
Preceded by Christopher Robinson	Organist and Master of the Choristers of St. George's Chapel, Windsor Castle; 1991–2002	Succeeded by Timothy Byram-Wigfield
