= Malcolm Boyle =

- Born: 1902
- Origin: Britain
- Died: 1976 (aged 73–74)
- Occupations: Organist and Composer

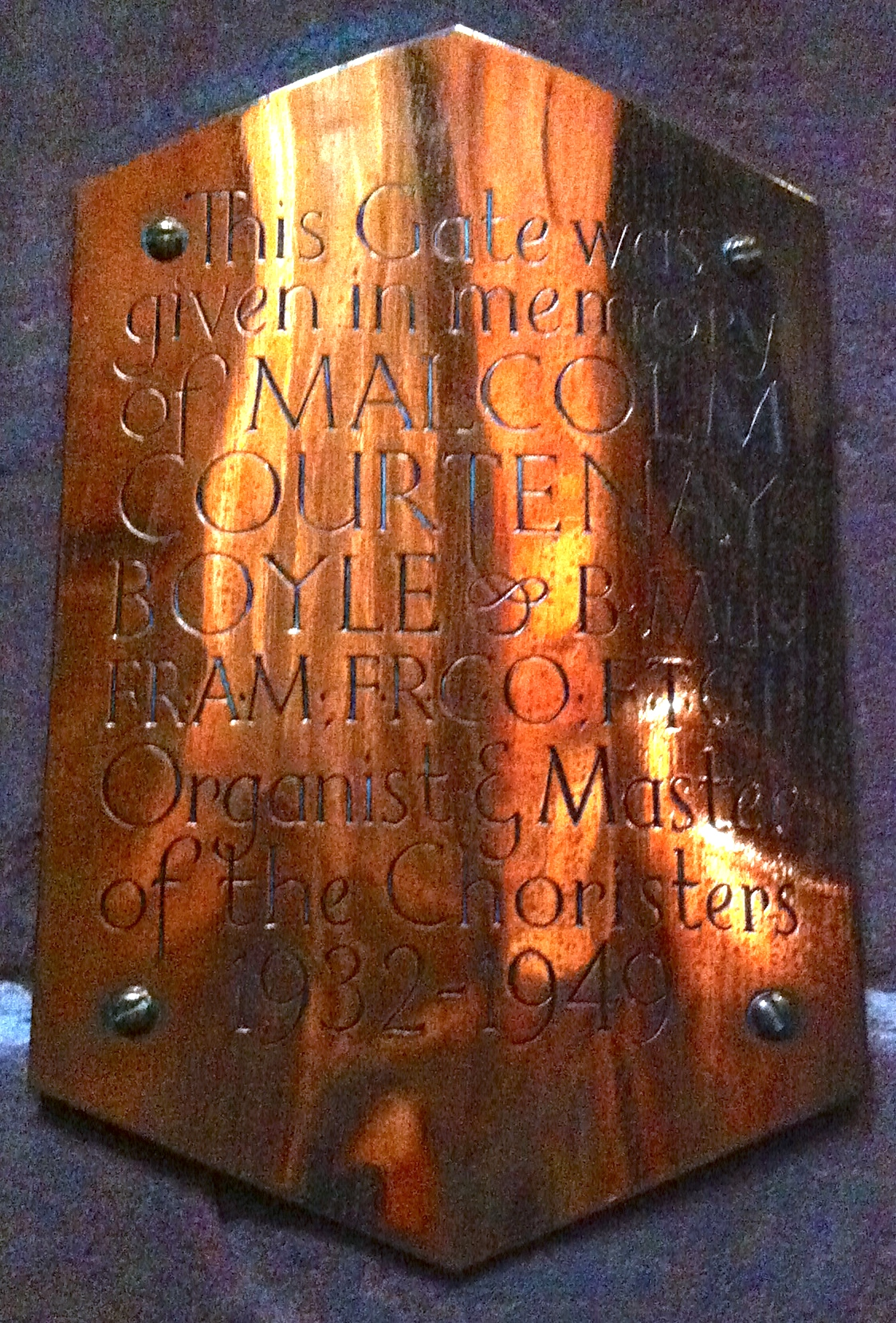
Memorial to Malcolm Courtenay Boyle in Chester Cathedral

Malcolm Courtenay Boyle (1902–1976) was a British organist and composer.

== Career ==
He was born in Windsor, England, and as a boy served as a chorister at Eton College. He became an organ pupil of Sir Walter Parratt of St. George's Chapel, Windsor. At age 17 he was appointed organist and choirmaster of Holy Trinity Garrison Church, Windsor. After taking his BMus at Queen's College, Oxford, he became Assistant organist to Sir Henry Walford Davies at St George's (1925-1932). He also attended the Royal Academy of Music in London where he had been granted an organ scholarship.

In 1932 he became organist of Chester Cathedral. As a divorcee, he was dismissed by the Dean and Chapter when he remarried in 1948.

In 1949 he was appointed an Examiner for the Associated Board of the Royal Schools of Music. In this capacity he travelled widely to New Zealand, India, Hong Kong, and the West Indies. He was chosen as one of a panel of specially co-opted musical adjudicators from Britain for Expo year in Canada.

His anthem "Thou, O God, art praised in Sion" still enjoys a place in the musical repertoire of the Anglican Communion. For many years no published edition was available, the piece only existing in manuscript form, having been written down from memory by Dr George Guest, who had been a chorister at Chester Cathedral under Boyle. The motet was later published by Paraclete Press. Fittingly, it was the introit at Dr. Guest's memorial service.

For the last decade of his life he was organist and choirmaster at his local church in Sandiway, Cheshire.

Cultural offices
Preceded by Charles Hylton Stewart	Organist and Master of the Choristers of Chester Cathedral; 1932-1948	Succeeded by James Roland Middleton
