= David G. Turner =

Canadian astronomer

David Turner
- Born: 1945 (age 80–81); Toronto, Ontario, Canada

Academic background
- Education: University of Waterloo (BS); University of Western Ontario (MS, PhD)

Academic work
- Discipline: Astronomy
- Institutions: Saint Mary's University

David G. Turner (born 1945) is a Canadian astronomer and professor (emeritus) in the department of astronomy and physics at Saint Mary's University.

== Early life and education ==
Turner was born in Toronto in 1945. He earned a Bachelor of Science degree from the University of Waterloo, followed by a Master of Science and PhD from the University of Western Ontario.

== Career ==
Turner was the editor of the Journal of the Royal Astronomical Society of Canada from 1995 to 2000, and continues as review editor. His research interests include stellar evolution, Cepheid variables, and open clusters. He is one of the foremost authorities on the North Star, Polaris. Asteroid 27810 Daveturner (= 1993 OC2) was named in his honor by Carolyn S. Shoemaker and David H. Levy.
