= David H. Turner =

Canadian anthropologist

David Howe Turner is a Canadian anthropologist, academic, and author known for his research on Indigenous cultures, particularly Aboriginal societies in Australia and Indigenous communities in Canada and India. He is Professor Emeritus of Anthropology at the University of Toronto, where he held academic appointments for several decades following earlier positions at the Australian National University and the University of Manitoba. Turner's scholarly work focuses on social organization, kinship systems, religion, and cultural adaptation among hunter-gatherer and Indigenous societies. He has conducted long-term fieldwork in Arnhem Land, Australia, as well as research in Canada, India, and other regions, and has published numerous books and articles on anthropology, religion, and Indigenous studies.

== Biography ==
Turner was born on July 18, 1941, in England, and emigrated to Canada with his parents in 1948. He pursued his early academic training in sociology at Carleton University, where he completed a Bachelor of Arts with honors in 1965. He later earned a Ph.D. in social anthropology from the University of Western Australia in 1971. His doctoral dissertation, The Warnungamagalyuagba and their neighbours: a study in adaptation, was supervised by Professor R.M. Berndt and examined by scholars including P.M. Worsley, W.E.H. Stanner, and M.J. Meggitt.

== Career ==
Turner began his professional career as a Postdoctoral Research Fellow at the Australian Institute of Aboriginal Studies in Canberra (1971). He subsequently joined the Australian National University as a foundation lecturer in Anthropology and Aboriginal Studies. In 1974, he moved to Canada, taking an appointment as Assistant Professor at the University of Manitoba, before joining the University of Toronto in 1975 as Associate Professor in the Department of Anthropology. He was promoted to full Professor in 1982 and later became professor emeritus following his retirement in 2012.

He has served as a Senior Fellow at Trinity College, University of Toronto, and has been a Fellow-in-Residence at the Netherlands Institute for Advanced Studies in the Humanities and Social Sciences.

Turner has also contributed to academic publishing and editorial activities, including serving on advisory boards such as the International Advisory Board of Studies in World Christianity. He is currently a member of the International Campaign for Tibet.

== Research ==
Turner's research and fieldwork have constituted a central component of his academic career, spanning several decades and multiple geographic regions, with a primary focus on Indigenous societies in Australia, Canada, India, and parts of Asia. His field-based approach combines ethnographic observation, participatory research, and long-term community engagement, particularly among hunter-gatherer and Indigenous populations.

Turner's earliest fieldwork began in the mid-1960s, when he conducted research in Canada on social issues including labor conflict in Ontario and poverty in Alberta’s Drumheller Valley. These early projects informed his undergraduate research and laid the groundwork for his later anthropological focus on social organization and economic systems in small communities.

Following the completion of his doctoral studies, Turner undertook extensive fieldwork in Australia under the auspices of the Australian Institute of Aboriginal Studies. His research in Arnhem Land, particularly in the Groote Eylandt and Bickerton Island regions, involved multiple field visits beginning in the late 1960s and continuing through the 1970s and beyond during which time he was initiated into the Law. He examined the social and cultural organization of Aboriginal communities, including kinship structures, ritual systems, land relationships, and mechanisms of cultural adaptation in changing environmental and political contexts.

In the 1970s and 1980s, Turner expanded his research within Indigenous Australian contexts to include studies of Aboriginal social organization, rock art, and economic systems. He also engaged in applied research projects, including consultancy work related to Aboriginal community governance in the Northern Territory. He was also instrumental, along with Barry Coulter, in seeing the return of the Strehlow Research Collection to Australia.

In addition to Australia, Turner conducted fieldwork among Indigenous communities in Canada, particularly Cree communities in Manitoba and Inuit communities in northern regions such as Pangnirtung, Baffin Island.

== Turner's view of indigenous Australian society ==
The indigenous Australians, far from being a primitive people, have a highly sophisticated society and worldview which, in Turner's view, is in many ways more advanced than those of modern Western civilization. According to Turner, the Aborigines have developed several social mechanisms for ensuring social and environmental harmony that run contrary to conventional Western thinking. In particular, rather than formulate their society around notions of personal or national autonomy and property, they favour a philosophy of mutual dependence. It is this mutual dependence, or interdependence, which ensures peaceful coexistence.

This is explicit in the Aboriginal practice of renunciation, which resembles reciprocal altruism but runs much deeper. Rather than reciprocal trading of resources, or sharing them by giving a portion of what one has to another, the Aborigines give everything of what they have to whoever needs it, as codified by the statement: "You have nothing, everything I have is yours; I have nothing, everything you have is mine."

Likewise, Turner notes that the Aborigines practice renunciation in their allocation of property. On Bickerton Island, each group of people within Aboriginal society lives within a defined region of land, and each region contains one major resource (such as fresh water or a particular type of food). Rather than having exclusive access to their region's resource (as in conventional concepts of ownership), the group is instead forbidden to consume it. In the Aboriginal world, such resources exist only to be given freely to members of neighbouring groups. Again, this is a method which makes self-sufficiency impossible, ensuring that neighbours must rely on each other and work to make their relations cooperative and peaceful.

Turner's view is that renunciation is not simply a concept or an economic theory, but a literal reenactment of creation as it is perceived by the Aborigines. For the Aborigines, physical and spiritual reality coexist, flowing in and out of each other in an endless process. Spiritual forms are always giving of themselves to make the world and the people in it. In such a world, it makes no sense to hold on to anything, because nothing is ever "yours" to begin with. So, an act of renunciation—even something as simple as giving food to a stranger who does not have any is an action which reflects the fundamental nature of reality itself.

Creation as it is perceived by the Aborigines follows the theoretical formulation: anti-thesis → thesis ⇒ plurality (Nothingness → being ⇒ relationship), an anathema to Western philosophy (thesis → anti-thesis ⇒ synthesis).

An act of renunciation—even something as simple as giving food to a stranger who does not have any—is an action that reflects the fundamental nature of reality itself. This can be perceived in the act of “seeing” the essential nature of things, indicating that everything in creation is itself and something about itself (its form-devoid-of-content, visible as a shadow or projection of radiant light) at the same time. Within this understanding, we are the source of our own creation through forces for forming (“structures,” as articulated by Mark Burgin in math/physics) in the cosmos. The experience of which is to feel a sense of expelling.

In Turner’s view, rather than simply failing to develop modern technologies, economics, and ways of living, at some point in their history (65,000 years in Australia), the Aborigines made a conscious decision to turn toward more socially and spiritually meaningful pursuits. They turned away from technology and toward each other. In doing so, they eliminated poverty, theft, social class, and warfare, and lived in peace for possibly tens of thousands of years.

== Scholarly works ==
Turner's early scholarly contributions include The Drumheller Valley (1967), based on his undergraduate research, which examined social conditions in a Canadian mining region. This was followed by his major ethnographic monograph Tradition and Transformation: a study of Aborigines in the Groote Eylandt area, northern Australia (1974), which drew directly from his doctoral fieldwork and provided an in-depth analysis of Aboriginal social organization, adaptation, and cultural continuity. His subsequent work Shamattawa: the structure of social relations in a northern Algonkian band (1977), co-authored with Paul Wertman, extended his research into Canadian Indigenous communities, focusing on kinship and social structure among Algonkian-speaking peoples.

During the late 1970s and 1980s, Turner contributed to theoretical and comparative anthropology through works such as Dialectics in Tradition: myth and social structure in two hunter-gatherer societies (1978) and Australian Aboriginal Social Organization: theme and variations (1980). These works explore the interplay between myth, social structure, and cultural systems, and reflect his interest in comparative frameworks across hunter-gatherer societies. He also co-edited Challenging Anthropology (1979) with Gavin Smith, a volume that engages with methodological and theoretical debates within the discipline.

Turner’s later publications reflect a growing interest in religion, philosophy, and comparative cultural analysis. In Life Before Genesis: a conclusion (1985), he examined Aboriginal cultural perspectives in relation to broader questions of origin, meaning, and cosmology. This line of inquiry continued in Return to Eden (1989; revised editions in 1996 and 2025), where he explored symbolic and interpretive dimensions of Aboriginal cultural landscapes. His subsequent works, including Afterlife Before Genesis (1997) and Genesis Regained (1999), further developed comparative analyses between Aboriginal traditions and Judeo-Christian religious frameworks.

In the 2000s and beyond, Turner’s scholarly output increasingly integrated personal reflection with academic inquiry, particularly in works such as The Spirit Lives (2002), which combines autobiographical narrative with discussions of religious experience and transformation. His more recent publications, including Eye of the Shaman: The Visions of Piona Keyuakjuk (2018), Life to the Power of N o t h i n g (2019–2023), and Pathway to the Stars, Playing for Alexa (2023), S e e i n g the E t e r n a l, publications with Rock's Mills Press continue to engage with themes of spirituality, perception, and cultural meaning, often blending ethnographic insight with interpretive and philosophical perspectives.

In addition to his books, Turner has authored numerous peer-reviewed journal articles addressing topics such as kinship theory, myth, rock art, and Aboriginal social organization. His article “The Rock Art of Groote Eylandt and Bickerton Island in Comparative Perspective” (1973), published in Oceania, and “The Myth of Levi-Strauss” (1977) in Anthropological Forum, reflect his engagement with major theoretical debates in anthropology. He has also contributed chapters to edited volumes and conference proceedings, further disseminating his research across academic forums.

== Selected publications ==
=== Books ===
- Turner, David H. 1974. Tradition and transformation: a study of the Groote Eylandt area aborigines of northern Australia. Australian aboriginal studies, no. 53. Canberra: Australian Institute of Aboriginal Studies.
- Turner, David H. 1977. The concept of kinship: some qualifications based on a re-examination of the Australian data. Leiden, Netherlands: Koninklijk Instituut voor Taal-, Land- en Volkenkunde.
- Turner, David H. 1977. Ideologues of band society: Nambir̄ir̄ma and Wee-sa-kay-jac. Toronto: Victoria University.
- Turner, David H., and Paul Wertman. 1977 Shamattawa: The Structure of Social Relations in a Northern Algonkian Band. Ottawa: National Museums of Canada.
- Turner, David H. 1978. Dialectics in tradition: myth and social structure in two hunter-gatherer societies. London: Royal Anthropological Institute of Great Britain and Ireland.
- Turner, David H., and Gavin A. Smith. 1979. Challenging anthropology: a critical introduction to social and cultural anthropology. Toronto: McGraw-Hill Ryerson. (with G. Smith).
- Turner, David H. 1980. Leiden anthropology and the reinterpretation of Australian Aboriginal social organization. Leiden, Netherlands: Koninklijk Institut voor Taal-, Land- en Volkenkunde.
- Turner, David H. 1981. Australian aboriginal social organization. Atlantic Highlands, N.J.: Humanities Press.
- Turner, David H. 1985. Life before Genesis, a conclusion: an understanding of the significance of Australian Aboriginal culture. Toronto studies in religion, vol. 1. New York: Peter Lang.
- Turner, David H. 1996. Return to Eden: a journey through the aboriginal promised landscape of Amagalyuagba. Toronto studies in religion, vol. 21. New York: Peter Lang.
- Turner, David H. 1997. Afterlife before Genesis: an introduction : accessing the eternal through Australian Aboriginal music. Toronto studies in religion, vol. 22. New York: Peter Lang.
- Turner, David H. 1999. Genesis regained: Aboriginal forms of renunciation in Judeo-Christian scriptures and other major traditions. Toronto studies in religion, vol. 25. New York: Peter Lang.
- Turner, David H. 2002. The spirit lives: a personal journey from loss to understanding through religious experience. New York: Peter Lang.
- Turner, David (2018). Eye of the Shaman: The Visions of Piona Keyuakjuk. Rock's Mills Press. ISBN 978-1-77244-148-2.
- Turner, David. Pathway to the Stars: : 9781772442847.
- Turner, David H. Return to Eden: : 9781772443875.
- Turner, D. H. (2025). Return to Eden: A journey through the promised landscape of Amagalyuagba (3rd ed., with new preface). Oakville: Rock’s Mills Press.
- Turner, D. H. (2025). “S e e i n g” the eternal. Oakville: Rock’s Mills Press.

=== Selected articles ===
- Turner, D. H. (1982). Caste logic in a clan society: An Aboriginal response to domination. In M. Howard (Ed.), Aboriginal power in Australian society. Brisbane, Australia: University of Queensland Press.
- Turner, D. H. (1991). Brahmanform: The Vedic-Hindu tradition in Aboriginal perspective. Man in India, 71(1), 47–65.
- Turner, D. H. (1991). Of Aborigines and Adivasis. Indian International Centre Diary, 5(4), 7.
- Turner, D. H. (1992). “We will always be Gujar”: The politics of nomadism in Himachal Pradesh. In G. Sen (Ed.), Indian International Centre Quarterly (Special issue for the Earth Summit, Rio). Reprinted in G. Sen (Ed.), Indigenous vision. London, England: Sage.
- Turner, D. H. (1994). Transcendent pluralism: An Aboriginal solution to difference. Sophia, 34(1), 173–187.
- Turner, David H. 1977. The concept of kinship: some qualifications based on a re-examination of the Australian data. Leiden, Netherlands: Koninklijk Instituut voor Taal-, Land- en Volkenkunde.
- Turner, D. H. (1995). Reaching out and reaching: Prayer in anthropological perspective. In L. Brown (Ed.), The human side of prayer: The psychology of praying (pp. 67–83). Birmingham: Religious Education Press.
- Turner, D. H. (1994). Toward a peaceful world order: A commentary. Gandhians in Action, 1, 79–86.
- Turner, D. H. (1994). Genocide on Groote Eylandt? Indigenous Affairs, 4(Oct–Dec), 54–57.
- Turner, D. H. (1996). Aboriginal religion as world religion. Edinburgh Review of Theology and Religious Studies, 1(2), 77–96.
- Turner, D. H. (1998). There is no Swaraj without suffering. Gandhians in Action, 4–5 (Golden Jubilee issue), 173–177.
- Turner, D. H. (1998). Afterlife before Genesis [CD recording]. New York: Peter Lang Publishing. (Produced in collaboration with Marc Costanzo).
- Turner, D. H. (1999). An Aboriginal outstation movement in Arnhem Land and the perils of advocacy anthropology. Nomadic Peoples, 3(1), 8–21.
- Turner, D. H. (2000). From here into eternity: Power and transcendence in Australian Aboriginal music. In G. Harvey & K. Ralls-MacLeod (Eds.), Indigenous religious musics. Aldershot: Ashgate Press.
