= Dave Turner (footballer, born 1948) =

English footballer

Personal information
- Full name: David Turner
- Date of birth: 26 December 1948 (age 77)
- Place of birth: Derby, England
- Position: Right back

Youth career
- 19??–1960: Everton

Senior career*
Years	Team	Apps	(Gls)
1966–1970	Everton	1	(0)
1970–1973	Southport	71	(0)
- Bootle
- Burscough Legion
- * Club domestic league appearances and goals

David Turner (born 26 December 1948) is an English former professional footballer who played as a right back in the Football League for Everton and Southport. He also played non-league football for clubs including Bootle and Burscough Legion. He made his debut – and only appearance – for Everton in the First Division on 20 April 1968 at home to Chelsea.
