= David Turner (Canadian football) =

Canadian football player

David Turner (born February 19, 1967, in Washington, D.C.) is a former gridiron player in the Canadian Football League. He was a defensive back primarily used as a kick return specialist with the Winnipeg Blue Bombers and Ottawa Rough Riders. Turner was undrafted out of East Texas State University where he excelled in Track and Field, skipping his senior season of football, but entering the C.F.L. as a free-agent with the Blue Bombers in 1989 and dealt to the Rough Riders in 1990.
