= Francesca Massey =

English Organist, Choral Conductor, Pianist and Music Teacher

Francesca Massey (born 1982) is the former Organist and Director of Music at Rochester Cathedral, a position she held from September 2019 to August 2022, when she was succeeded by Adrian Bawtree. Previously, she was Sub-Organist at Durham Cathedral from 2011. In addition to being a professional Church/Concert Organist, Massey is actively engaged as a Choral Conductor, Pianist, Organ and Music Teacher both privately and on behalf of Durham University, Oundle for Organists and the RSCM.

Born in Birmingham in 1982, Francesca was educated at Cambridge University and the Royal Northern College of Music (on a prestigious ABRSM Scholarship). She has held organ scholarships at St George's Chapel, Windsor Castle, Gonville and Caius College, Cambridge and Manchester Cathedral, and was Assistant Organist at Great St Mary's Church, Cambridge and Assistant Director of Music at Peterborough Cathedral.

At the age of 19, Massey gained all of the top prizes in the Fellowship of the Royal College of Organists’ diploma and was subsequently awarded the WT Best Memorial Scholarship and Silver Medal of the Worshipful Company of Musicians, and the Musicians Benevolent Fund’s Ian Fleming Award. Her many teachers and mentors included Frances Gibbs, Jeremy Filsell, Kevin Bowyer, David Goode, Darius Battiwalla and Andrew Fletcher, and she also participated in masterclasses with many other well known Concert Organists including Dame Gillian Weir, Harald Vogel, David Briggs, Peter Hurford and Naji Hakim. She was the repetiteur for the Windsor and Eton Choral Society under Ralph Allwood, and the Birmingham Bach Choir under Paul Spicer, and also taught for Cambridge University Faculty of Music as a Supervisor in Keyboard Skills, Harmony, Counterpoint, Fugue and Tonal Composition.

Massey performs regularly as a recitalist throughout the UK. Her debut solo disc entitled Bravura! (on the Priory Records label) received excellent reviews: it was Editor’s Choice in Organists’ Review, and described as ‘a diverse and imaginative programme that is superbly played….a ‘must’ for all organ enthusiasts.’ Her second solo disc, "The Forgotten Gem - Francesca Massey plays The Organ of King's Lynn Minster" received excellent coverage, with a five star rating in Organists' Review: "Massey's playing of the early repertoire is particularly engaging however she is equally at home in the 20th century literature. This instrument is well worth hearing and this disc admirably reflects its quality and versatility."

Massey has played throughout Europe and South Africa as an accompanist, as well as recording a number of CDs with various choirs; Gramophone Magazine describing her as a ‘hugely gifted accompanist.’ She is the Assistant Musical Director of The Durham Singers, and is engaged as an organ teacher, having worked as a tutor on courses hosted by Oundle for Organists, the IAO and the RSCM amongst others. Massey also performs as a continuo player and pianist.

She is not related to the sometime Organist of Hereford Cathedral, Roy Massey.

== Personal life ==
Francesca Massey is married to the tenor David Booer.
