= Greg Morris (organist) =

British musician (born 1976)

Greg Morris (born 1976) is an English organist and conductor.

Morris was educated at Manchester Grammar School, where he began to study the organ under Andrew Dean. Upon leaving school he took up the post of organ scholar at St George's Chapel, Windsor Castle. He went on to study music at Jesus College, Cambridge, where he accompanied and directed the two chapel choirs. He was organ scholar at St Martin-in-the-Fields, London, before being appointed as Assistant Director of Music at Blackburn Cathedral in 2000. Whilst at Blackburn he performed the World Premiere of David Briggs' Organ Concerto and was a regular accompanist on BBC Radio 4's The Daily Service.

In September 2006 he took up the post of Associate Organist of the Temple Church in London - a post which he combines with a career as a freelance organist and choral director. Over a period of 10 months during 2017 and 2018, he performed the complete organ works of J.S.Bach in a series of 28 recitals at venues across London. In July 2019 he took up a new post as Director of Music at St Margaret's Church, Westminster Abbey.

Morris studied the organ with Paul Stubbings, John Kitchen and Thomas Trotter. He gained the FRCO (Fellow of the Royal College of Organists) diploma in 2000, winning the Limpus, Frederick Shinn and Durrant Prizes for organ playing and the Samuel Baker Prize for overall performance. As a soloist he has performed at several venues both in the UK and abroad, including St Paul's Cathedral, Westminster Abbey, and Brunswick Cathedral in Braunschweig, Germany. His first solo CD, Sounds Inspirational, was released in 2003.

== Discography ==
- Sounds Inspirational (2003)
- Organ Concerto & Requiem by David Briggs (2005)
- Sounds Orchestral, with David Gibbs (2006)
