= Charles Hylton Stewart =

English cathedral organist

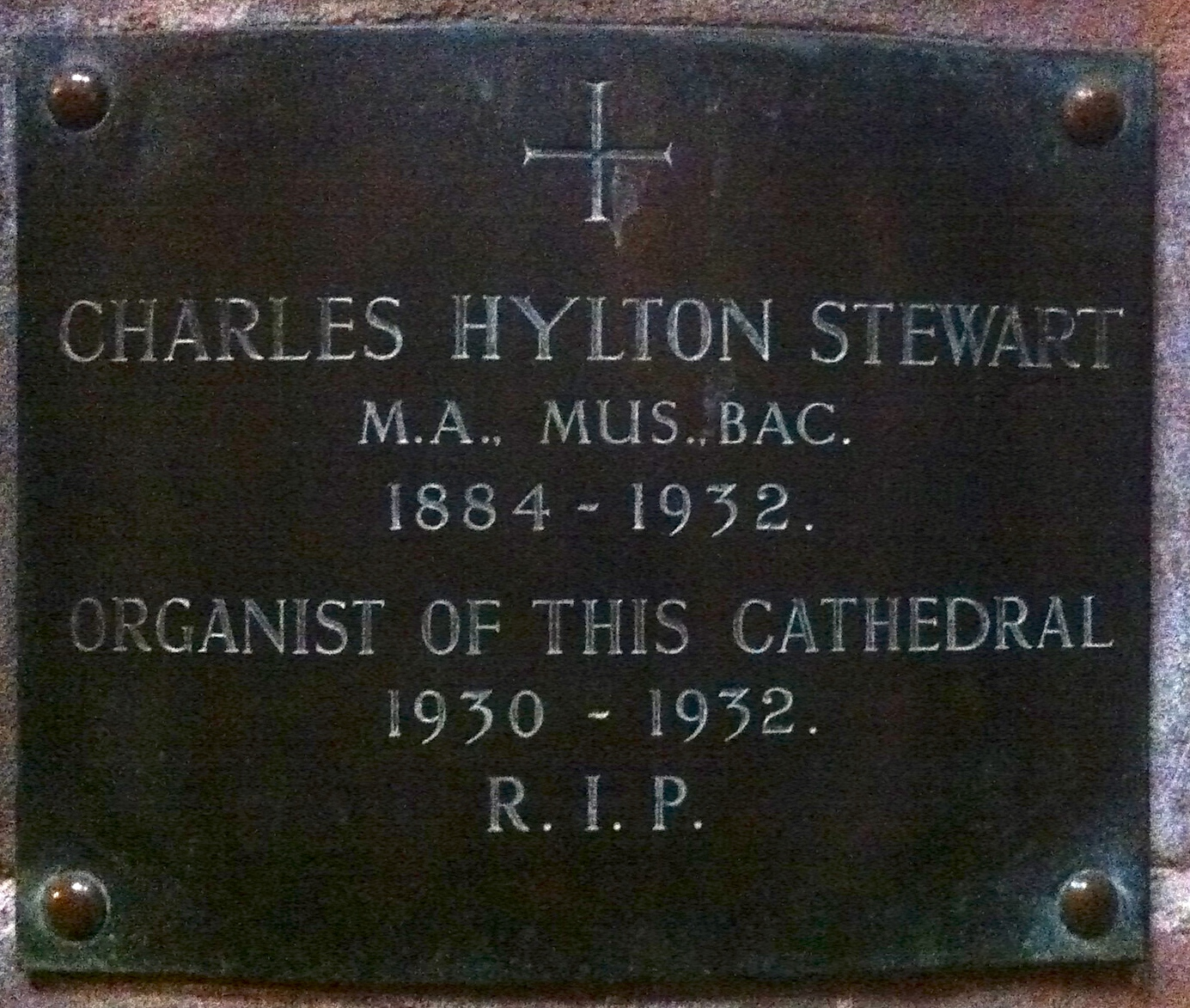
Memorial to Charles Hylton Stewart in Chester Cathedral

Arthur Charles Lestoc Hylton Stewart (21 March 1884 – 14 November 1932) was an English organist and composer.

== Early life and education ==
The son of the Rev. Charles Henry Hylton Stewart and Florence Hope Dixon, Stewart was born at Chester and educated at Magdalen College School, Oxford. Like his younger brother Bruce, he was an organ scholar at Peterhouse, Cambridge.

== Career ==
After teaching music at Sedbergh School from 1907 to 1908, Stewart served successively as organist and music director at St Martin-on-the-Hill, Scarborough (1908–1914), Blackburn parish church (1914–1916), Rochester Cathedral (1916–1930), Chester Cathedral (1930–1932) and St. George's Chapel, Windsor Castle (1932). He died shortly after taking up his post at Windsor.

Stewart composed several works for the organ and for choirs, including the tune "Rochester" for the hymn 'Light of the lonely pilgrim's heart' by Sir Edward Denny (New English Hymnal 399).

== Family ==
In 1917 Stewart married Gladys Maud Priestley Inglis, the daughter of Charles John Inglis and granddaughter of Dr. James Inglis.

Cultural offices
Preceded by Richard Henry Coleman	Organist and Master of the Choristers of Blackburn Cathedral; 1914–1916	Succeeded by Herman Brearley
Preceded by Bertram Luard-Selby	Organist and Master of the Choristers of Rochester Cathedral; 1916–1930	Succeeded by Harold Aubie Bennett
Preceded by John Hughes	Organist and Master of the Choristers of Chester Cathedral; 1930–1932	Succeeded by Malcolm Boyle
Preceded by Henry Walford Davies	Organist and Master of the Choristers of St. George's Chapel, Windsor Castle; 1932	Succeeded by William Henry Harris
