= Citywire =

Financial publisher

- Type: Media company
- Industry: Asset Management
- Founded: 1999
- Headquarters: 3 Spring Mews; London; SE11 5AN; United Kingdom,
- Key people: Lawrence Lever (Chairman) Nick Collard (CEO); David Turner (Director) Gareth Williams (COO)
- Number of employees: 300
- Website: www.citywire.com

Citywire is a London-based business that produces digital publications covering wealth, investments, and related topics. The company has over 60 journalists.

== History ==
Citywire was founded in 1999 by Lawrence Lever. In 2001 Reuters acquired a stake in the company. Following various mergers and acquisitions, including Refinitiv, the London Stock Exchange Group now holds this minority stake. The remainder of the company is owned by private investors and employees.

== See also ==
- Morningstar
- Reuters
- Bloomberg
