= David Turner (journalist) =

British businessperson (born 1965)

- Born: May 1965 (age 60–61)
- Occupation: Businessperson

David Conway Turner (born May 1965) is a British businessperson. In August 2000, he became a managing director of the financial publishing company Citywire.

== Career ==
He was at the Financial Times for ten years where he was publisher of all the FT Group's business publications.

Turner joined Citywire shortly after its 1999 launch.

== See also ==
- List of people from London
