= Manchester Grammar School =

Independent school in England

The Manchester Grammar School
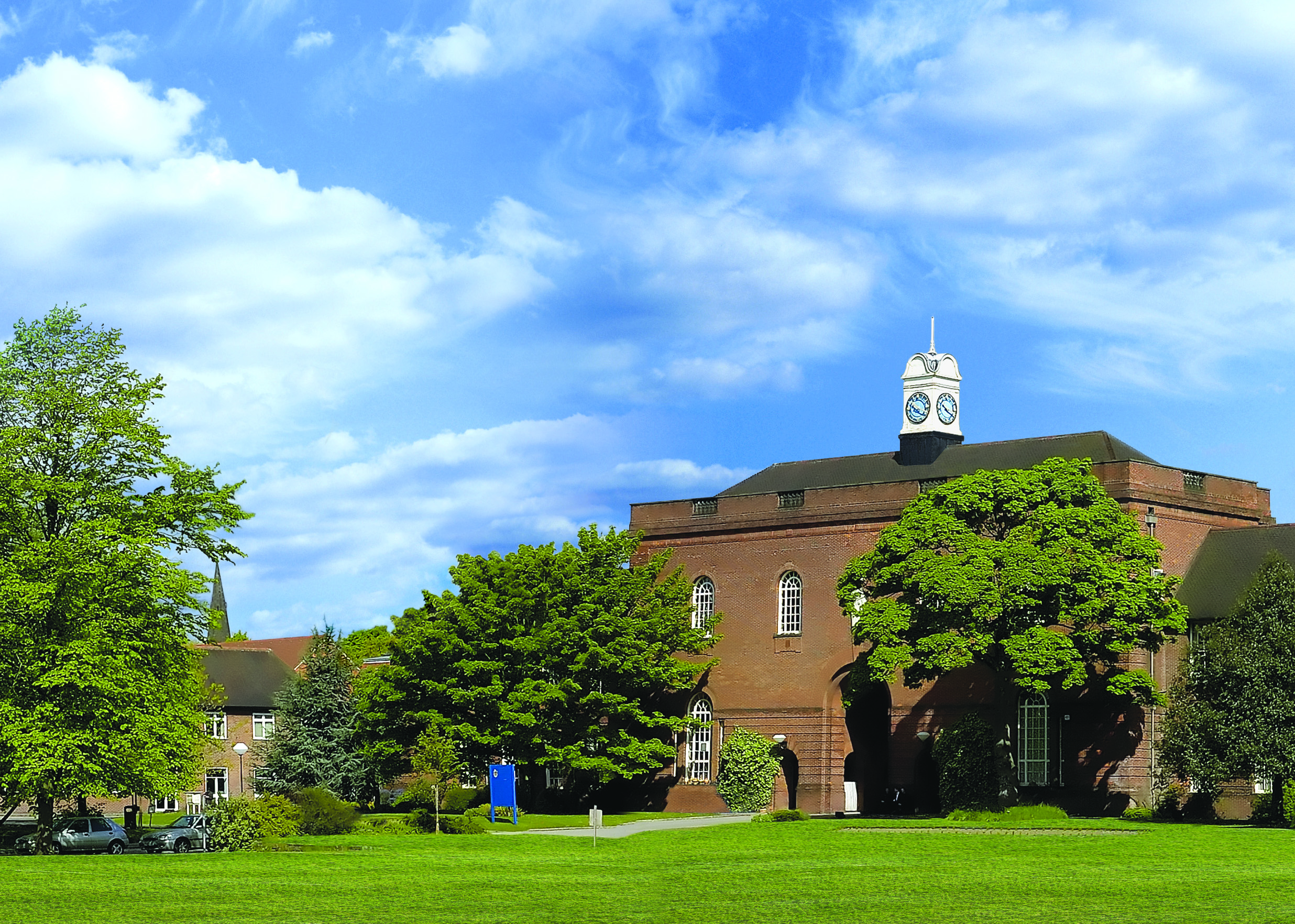
- School Coat of Arms (based on the canting arms ("owl-dham") of its founder Bishop Hugh Oldham, depicting in chief his diocesan Exeter arms between red Lancastrian roses) Manchester Grammar School Main Building

Location
- Old Hall Lane; Manchester, Greater Manchester, M13 0XT; United Kingdom; 53.448611°N 2.210278°W

Information
- Type: 7–18 boys private day school Public School
- Motto: Sapere Aude (Dare to be wise)
- Established: 1515; 511 years ago
- Founder: Hugh Oldham
- Department for Education URN: 105591 Tables
- Chair of Governors: Clare Bolton
- High Master: Martin Boulton
- Staff: c. 240
- Gender: Boys
- Age: 7 to 18
- Enrolment: 1,659 boys
- Capacity: 1,750 boys
- Colour
- Publication: MGS News; Ulula; New Mancunian
- Alumni: Old Mancunians
- Website: mgs.org

The Manchester Grammar School (MGS) is a highly selective private day school for boys aged 7–18 in Manchester, England, which was founded in 1515 by Hugh Oldham (then Bishop of Exeter). It is the largest private day school for boys in the United Kingdom and has been described as "one of Britain's most prestigious independent day schools", known for its strong academic focus; having educated politicians, leading journalists, diplomats, Nobel laureates, poets, as well as Academy Award and BAFTA award-winning actors and directors.

Originally named 'The Manchester Free Grammar School for Lancashire Boys', The Manchester Grammar School was founded by Hugh Oldham in 1515 adjacent to Manchester Parish Church as a free grammar school and as the first school in Manchester. The school grounds slowly expanded for over 400 years until 1931, when the school successfully raised a sum to move its premises from a now over-crowded site in the centre of Manchester to its much larger present site at Rusholme. In accordance with its founder's wishes, MGS remains a predominantly academic school and belongs to the Headmasters' and Headmistresses' Conference.

In the post-war period, MGS was a direct-grant grammar school. It chose to become an independent school in 1976 after the Labour government abolished the Direct Grant System. Fees for 2023–2024 were £15,180 per annum.

== History ==
=== Foundation ===
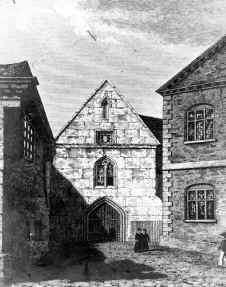
A drawing of the Chetham's Gatehouse circa 1600.

The founder, Hugh Oldham, a Manchester-born man, attended Exeter College, Oxford and Queens' College, Cambridge, after having been tutored in the house of Thomas Stanley, 1st Earl of Derby. Historical accounts suggest that he was not a particularly learned man, but was in Royal service, being a favoured protégé of Margaret Beaufort, Countess of Richmond and Derby, mother of Henry VII, and became recognised for his administrative abilities. He was appointed Bishop of Exeter in 1505. His great wealth came from his water-powered corn mills on the River Irk near Manchester, which were subsequently used to fund the school's endowment.

On 2 July 1515 he signed an endowment trust deed establishing the Manchester Free Grammar School for Lancashire Boys. A site was purchased in September 1516 and construction took place between April 1517 and August 1518. The combined cost was £218.13s.5d, largely given by Oldham, but with the help of his and the Bexwyke (Beswick) family who had provided an earlier endowment for a school within the parish church. A more elaborate deed in 1525 set the detailed rules for the school until the late 19th century.

The original deed promoted "Godliness and good learning" and established that any boy showing sufficient academic ability, regardless of background, might attend, free of charge. The school was situated between Manchester Cathedral, then a collegiate church, and the church's domestic quarters, subsequently Chetham's School of Music.

Later, Oldham's great friend Richard Foxe, the Bishop of Winchester, wished to found a monastery. Oldham, however, convinced him instead to found Corpus Christi College in Oxford and contributed 6,000 marks of silver (£4,000). Oldham also had a hand in the founding of Brasenose College, Oxford.

=== Early history ===
Classroom at MGS' old site

The original foundation provided a school house in the curtilage of Manchester's Parish Church and two graduates (the 'High Master' and the 'Usher') to teach Latin and later Greek, to any children who presented themselves. The school was intended to prepare pupils for university and eventually the Church or the legal profession. Typically, pupils would have stayed for 8 to 10 years before leaving for university. There was often enough money to fund bursaries or exhibitions for pupils.

In 1654, the world's first free public library was formed next door to MGS in what had been the church's living quarters. This was facilitated by a bequest from a wealthy businessman (and ex-pupil) Humphrey Chetham, which also served to create a bluecoat orphanage there, schooling 40 poor boys.

By the 18th century, there are thought to have been between 50 and 100 boys in the grammar school at any one time, three or four of whom each year were awarded exhibitions to Oxford and Cambridge. An extra room had been built onto the school house for boys who needed instruction in English before they started Latin, and another master was employed to teach them.

The 1515 building was replaced on the same site in 1776. This was on two levels, an Upper School for the Latin and Greek pupils, a Lower School for the English pupils. Boarding-houses were added and many of the Upper School pupils were boarders from surrounding counties. When De Quincy came as a boarder in 1800, classes were held at roughly 7.00am to 9.00, 9.30 to 12.00 and 3.00pm to 5.00.

By 1808 consideration was being given to moving from the site, as it was becoming insalubrious, but this proved impossible as the deed could not be changed except by Act of Parliament.

Going from the Old Church to Long Millgate ... one is in an almost undisguised working men's quarter, for even the shops and beerhouses hardly take the trouble to exhibit a trifling degree of cleanliness ... [The Irk, immediately beside the school,] is a narrow, coal black, foul smelling stream full of debris and refuse.

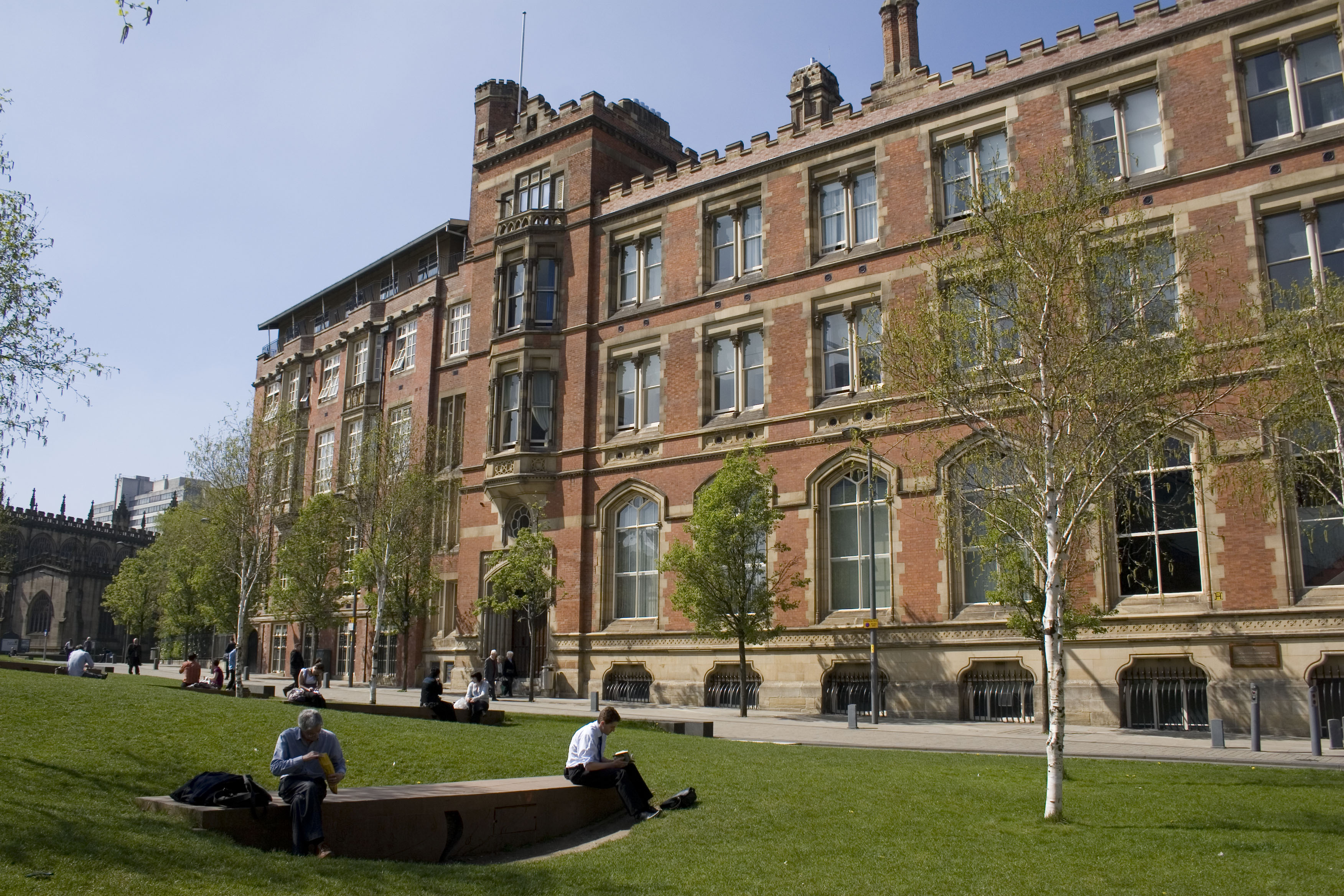
Manchester Grammar extension built in the 1870s (old site)

A commercial school, in parallel with the classical school, and more suited to Manchester's business climate, was established in the 1830s. By this time the school was getting richer on the proceeds of the mills which provided its funding and had a growing surplus on account. Its 'feoffees' (or governors) were mostly landed gentry from outside Manchester and they were heavily criticised for running the school to suit the needs of their offspring rather than as originally intended, the poor of Manchester. This led to a long running suit at the Court of Chancery, which eventually promoted the commercial side at the expense of the classical side of the school.

The area around the school continued to change. During the 1840s, Victoria Railway Station was completed opposite the school and the church became Manchester Cathedral. Then, in the 1870s, a new building, the Manchester Grammar Extension, was built, designed by Alfred Waterhouse, and including new classrooms, laboratories and a gymnasium, reflecting the wider curriculum that had developed since the 1830s. It was connected to the original by a first-storey bridge. It was said that the bridge's purpose was not for ease of movement between the parts of the school, but rather to dwarf Chetham's gatehouse both in terms of size and grandeur.

The tenure of Michael George Glazebrook as High Master, beginning in 1888, saw the introduction of three changes according to pupil Ernest Barker: a system of prefects to keep order, the singing of school songs conducted by John Farmer, and the wearing of school-caps and school-hats.

=== Recent history ===
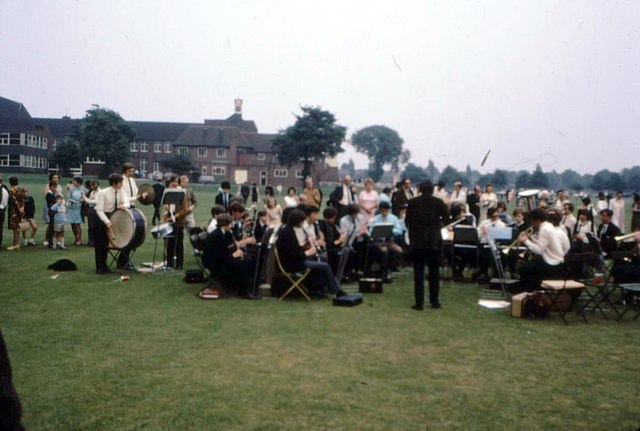
Open day concert, 1971

By the early 20th century the school was increasingly receiving funding from the state. This was negligible in 1901, fees providing three quarters of the income, most of the remainder being from the foundation. But by 1931, state grants contributed nearly 30% of the total, and the number of pupils had increased to 1,100.

In 1930 the school moved out of the city centre to accommodate a growing pupil body and provide a wider range of facilities. The new location chosen was in Rusholme, off Old Hall Lane, where the school still stands today.

Both of the school's earlier buildings lay empty, and while the former was destroyed in the Second World War, the latter, renamed the Long Millgate Building, became a teacher training college in the 1950s. In 1969, Chetham's School of Music was founded and occupied what had been the orphanage. When the teacher training college closed in 1978, Chetham's took over the premises.

After the Education Act 1944, MGS became a direct grant grammar school, which meant that the bulk of funding was provided by government. Entry was by merit (based on examination) and parents were means-tested and fees paid primarily by local education authorities on a sliding scale. Fees paid by parents amounted to less than 20% of the total income. It reverted to independent status in 1976 after the Labour government – in the person of Education Secretary Shirley Williams – abolished the direct-grant funding system. Bursaries continue to support the merit based recruitment system, by abating fees for less well-off pupils.

When the Assisted Places Scheme was rescinded in the late 1990s, MGS set up a "Bursary Appeal". This has accumulated a value of over £17.5m and finances bursaries, given to boys whose parents are unable to afford the school fees (£12,930 per annum in 2019/20). Scholarships are not awarded.

In 2015 the school walked 500 miles to celebrate its 500 years anniversary. Boys and teachers were asked to raise money for the Bursary Appeal and walk a mile each. Over 240 pupils currently receive help from the fund.

== Motto, coat of arms and school badges ==
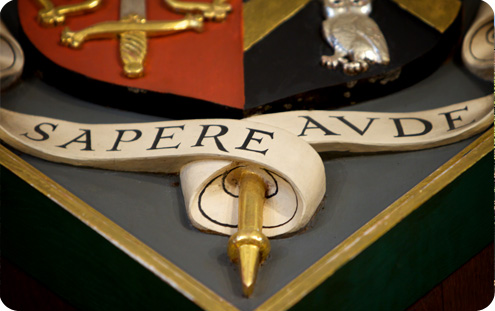
Sapere Aude, Manchester Grammar School's motto

The school's motto is Sapere Aude ("Dare to be Wise"), which was also the motto of the council of the former County Borough of Oldham (now, with the same coat of arms, the Metropolitan Borough of Oldham), granted on 7 November 1894. Sapere aude is a quotation from Horace, famously used by Immanuel Kant and also the motto of the Enlightenment.

The Senior School badge is an outline of an owl, carrying a banner with the word "dom" on it. This is a heraldic "canting" reference to its founder, Hugh Oldham, and the badge should be read as "owl-dom". This suggests that he pronounced his name, as the local accent in Oldham still tends to do, as "Ow[l]dem". Owls are also to be seen in the shield of the Borough of Oldham.

There is possibly a second significance to the "dom" of which Hugh Oldham, as a bishop, would have been very well aware. D.O.M. was and is a standard abbreviation for Deo Optimo Maximo meaning "To God, the Best and the Greatest", a phrase of dedication often required to be written by schoolboys before the Reformation and in Roman Catholic education since, at the head of a new piece of work, a practice continued into adult life by many as they committed a new undertaking into God's hands. This badge replaced the original one when the school colours changed from red, black and yellow to dark and light blue to reflect its connection with the universities of Oxford and Cambridge.

The Junior School badge, which depicts the face of an owl, was introduced to blazers and ties in 2008.

== Buildings ==
=== Main building ===
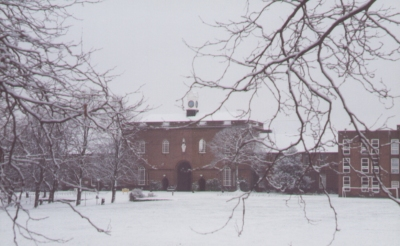
main building in 2007

The main building was designed in 1929 by Francis Jones and Percy Worthington. In keeping with the style of Oxbridge, it features a quadrangle and a grandiose Memorial Hall. Entrance to the quad is by a tripartite arch under a clock tower cupola. There is also the Paton Library (named after J. L. Paton, a former High Master), MGS Archive Room (formerly the Alan Garner Junior Library, which has since become part of the Paton Library), Common Room, Refectory, Medical Centre, Book Shop, Gymnasium and Swimming Pool. This is in addition to classrooms (subjects taught in this building are Art and Design, Mathematics, Economics, Classical Civilisation, Computing, Greek, History, Latin, Religion and Philosophy) and administrative offices.

The main building also houses the Parker Art Hall which is a three-storey arts studio, situated in the south side of the main building. It is named after former High Master J. G. Parker. It includes a ceramics department with two kilns on the ground floor and also a dark room for photography.

Since opening in 1931 the site at Fallowfield has seen many additions to the accommodation as indicated below.

==== Mason building ====
This is the school's language department, named after P. G. Mason, a former High Master, during whose tenure the building was erected. On the ground floor there are the Language Labs, two suites of listening stations, mainly used to practise the listening parts of national exams. This building was originally the school's Sixth Form block, with construction beginning in 1965. The foundation stone was laid by The Queen on the occasion of her visit in 1965. By 1970 the shoddiness of the workmanship and materials used was revealed by the cracks which had already started appearing in the internal walls. It is joined to the main building on the ground floor by the Paton Library.

==== Marks building ====
Named after former pupil Simon Marks, son of Michael Marks, founder of the Marks & Spencer empire. It is just west of the main building, and was erected in 1958. Major extensions were made by addition of the first floor (after a gift of £50,000 from Lord Marks) and the Israel Sieff Lecture Theatre (after a gift of £5,000 from Lord Marks' brother-in-law), which were opened on 19 September 1962. It currently hosts the following departments: Physics, General Science (taken by Year 7 and 8 pupils – before the subject splits into the usual three divisions), Geography, Computing and Mathematics. There are five physics laboratories, including one for radioactive experimentation, on the ground floor. The main computer room is on the first floor of the Marks building.

==== Theatres and drama ====
Sieff Theatre is named after former pupil, Israel Sieff, is situated at the end of the Marks Building and was refurbished in 2006; it is used for lectures and assemblies, as well as being the venue to Muslim Friday prayers. The MGS Theatre has recently undergone extensive rebuilding, to provide a modern and comfortable auditorium, together with studios for rehearsals and drama teaching. The Drama Centre Campaign is chaired by Sir Nicholas Hytner (Director of the National Theatre and a former pupil) who brought Alan Bennett and the actors from The History Boys to launch the campaign in 2006.

==== Sports hall and rectory building ====
The Michael Atherton Sports Hall was opened by Mike Atherton (a former pupil) in 1997 and subsequently used by the BBC Philharmonic Orchestra in recording of a live CD. The sports hall was severely damaged in a gale in February 2014 and had to be demolished. There are also 2 squash courts adjacent to the sports hall. The former rectory of St James's Birch-in-Rusholme (the adjacent redundant church) is located near the Sports Hall, and is the home of the Biology Department. However, only A-level biology is taught there. A new sports hall was opened in 2016.

A new Sixth Form Centre and Pavilion, the Hibbitt Centre, was opened in 2026, replacing the old cricket pavilion.

==== Music school ====
Located at the rear of the school, it is the building where the music department is based. There is a music library in the basement as well as a dozen or so music practice rooms, each having a piano, used for private lessons. It contains a keyboard suite allowing first and second years to learn basic keyboard playing and a hall on the west side used primarily for orchestra rehearsals. The original part of the building where the practice rooms are now located had been used in the 1950s and '60s as a bicycle shed.

=== Junior School buildings ===
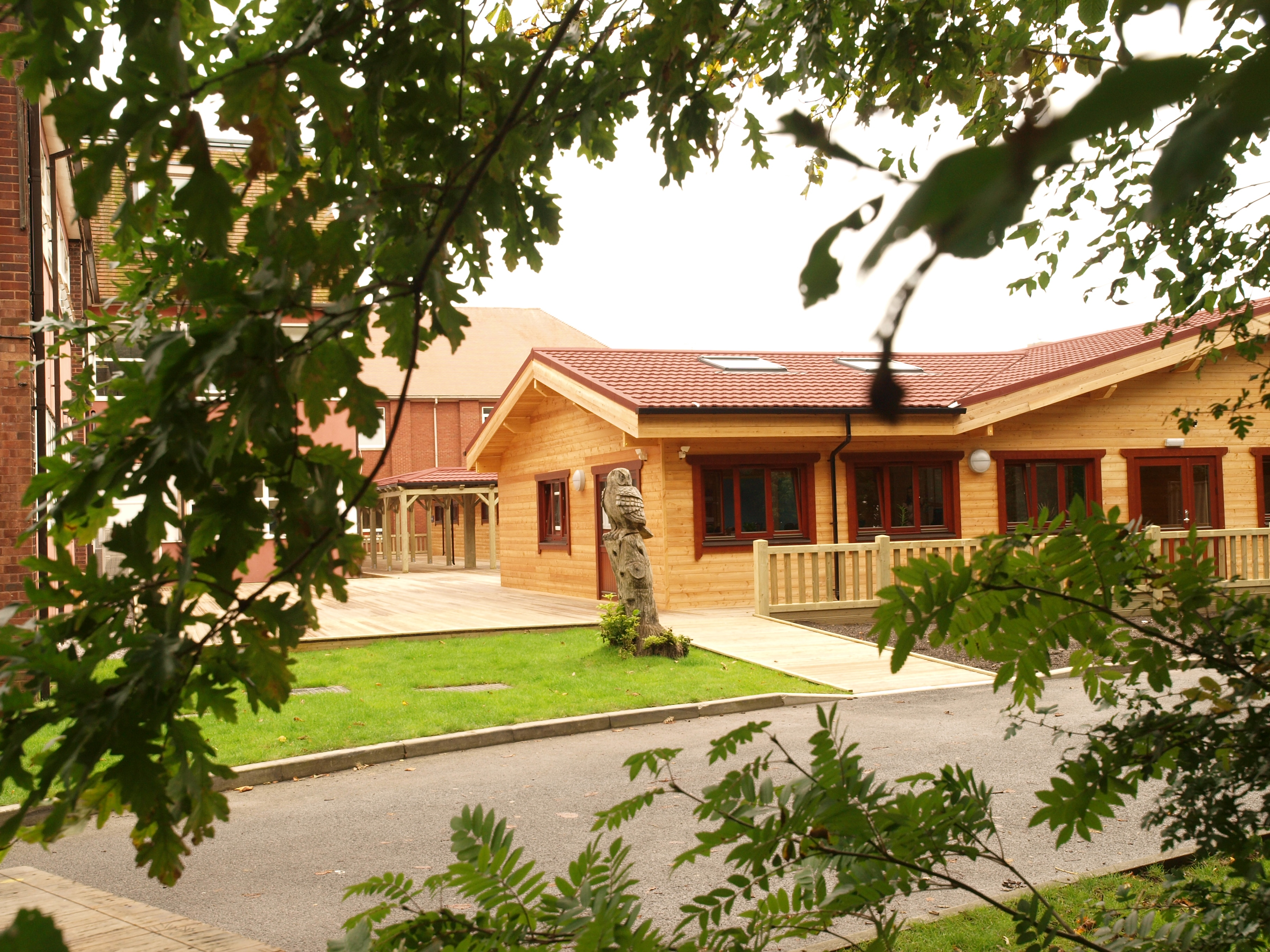
Bexwyke Lodge

In September 2008, MGS opened a Junior School for pupils in Years 5 and 6, extended to Years 3 and 4 in September 2011. Boys entering the Junior School do not sit an entrance exam but attend an assessment day and gain automatic admission into Year 7. The Junior School buildings are both state-of-the-art timber buildings, constructed from sustainable materials imported from Estonia.

Junior School pupils in Years 3, 4 and most of Year 5 are located in Plessyngton Lodge. Year 6 and one class of year 5 pupils work in Bexwyke Lodge.

=== Outdoor Study and Pursuits Centres ===
The school owns the Owls' Nest, a large hut situated in Disley, south of Manchester, near to Lyme Park. The original ex-Army hut was opened at Christmas 1920, but it was destroyed by a German bomb on 23 December 1940, and a replacement was provided in 1950. The building is used by forms and activity groups of the school as a base for outdoor trips and camping expeditions.

== Curriculum and attainment ==
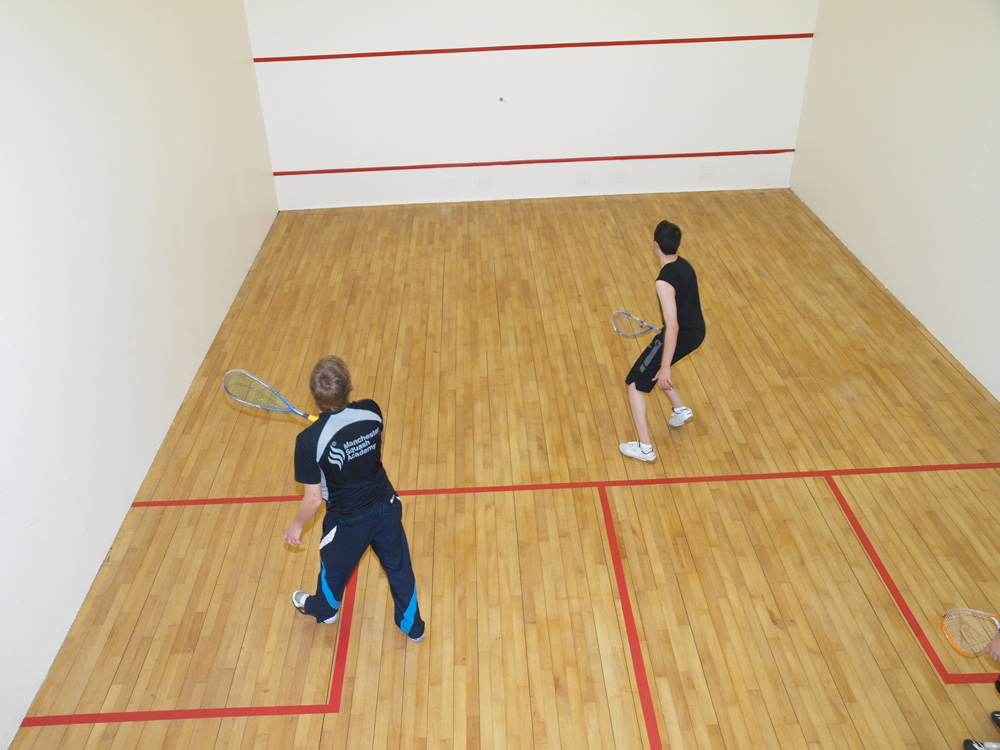
Boys on the squash court at Manchester Grammar School, 2009

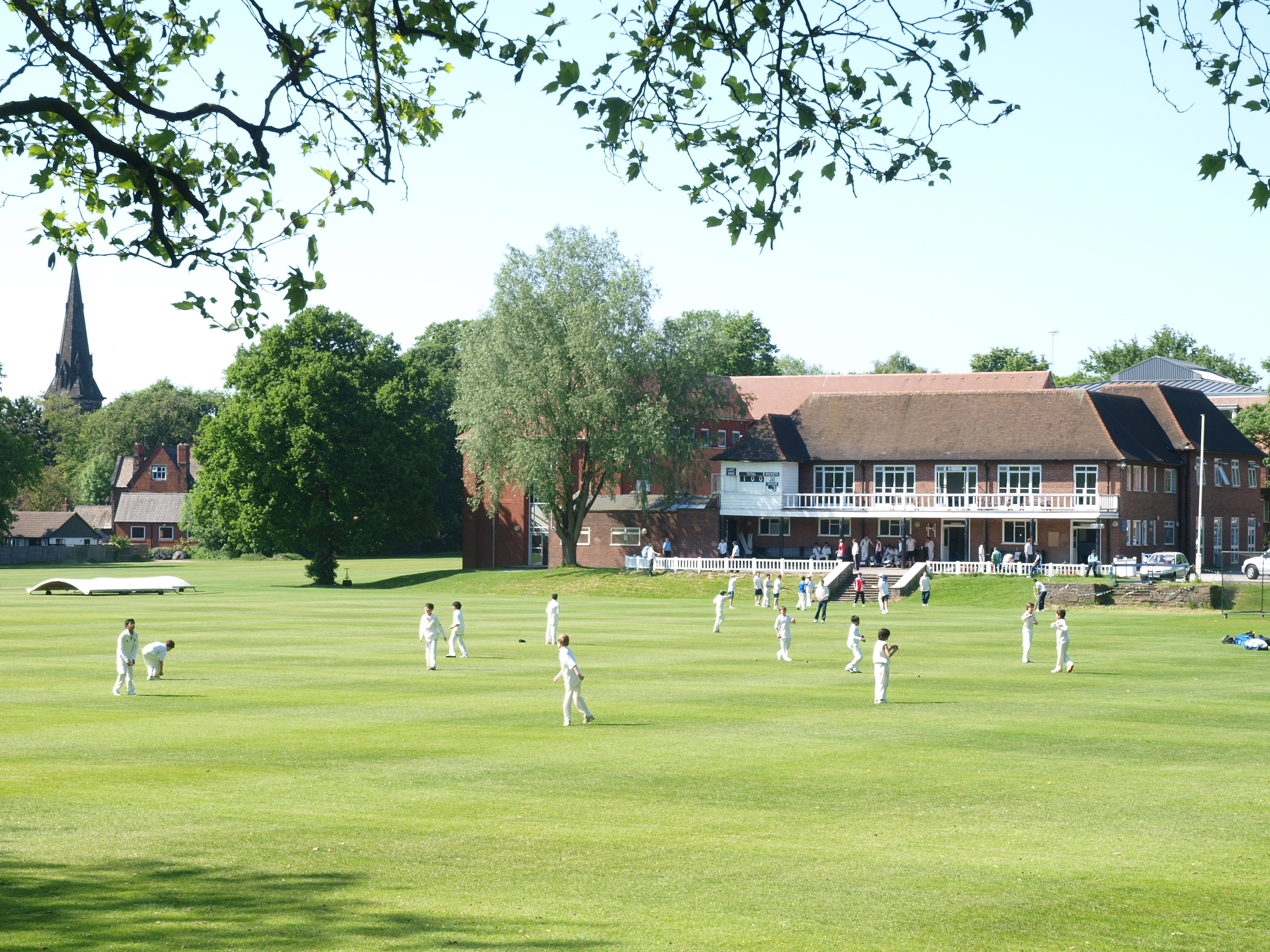
Boys participating in sports in front of The Pavilion building, 2010

The school was among the first in the UK to adopt the International Mathematics GCSE. Soon afterwards, MGS also adopted the three Sciences and today it offers the IGCSE in most subjects. The main difference between IGCSE and GCSE is that the IGCSE does not have a compulsory coursework element, primarily because it would be too costly to moderate around the world.

The maths and science departments decided that pupils were finding the coursework (which forms a fifth of the marks awarded in the national GCSE) undemanding and tedious and so made the switch in 2005. In 2009 the GCSE was replaced by the IGCSE in most subjects (see below). At the same time the school began to offer additional GCSEs in Electronics and Mandarin Chinese, as well as Economics at A Level.

Subjects available at GCSE/IGCSE are:

- Art and Design (GCSE)
- Biology
- Chemistry
- Classical Civilisation (GCSE)
- Classical Greek (GCSE)
- Computer Science
- Drama (GCSE)
- English Language
- English Literature
- Electronics (GCSE)
- Geography
- History
- Latin (GCSE)
- Mathematics & Further Mathematics (GCSE)
- Modern Languages (French, Spanish, Italian, German, Russian (GCSE), Mandarin Chinese (GCSE))
- Music
- Physics
- Religious Studies

All the above subjects are available as Post-16 Qualifications (A-Level, International A-Level or Pre-U) as well as Politics and Economics.

The school is known for its outstanding academic results. In 2017 91% of all A-Level grades were A*-B and at GCSE/IGCSE 68% of all grades were at the A* level.

== Publications ==
There are three publications focusing on the school. Ulula is an annual full-colour magazine detailing life at MGS during the year. MGS News is an annual 20-page glossy magazine published in October. It illustrates articles on the successes of MGS pupils, along with features on Old Mancunians and school events and activities. It is produced in-house by the Public Relations Department for visitors at open events, current and prospective parents and teachers and the wider MGS community. The New Mancunian, is the school pupil newspaper which is written and produced by pupils and has won several national awards. The name echoes the Old Mancunian which is a monthly pamphlet sent out to ex-pupils.

Specialist publications are produced by societies, such as the Philsoc and Docsoc (science and medical societies respectively) magazines.

== Old Mancunians – notable alumni ==
The school's alumni are called "Old Mancunians", or informally Old Mancs, and include academics, politicians, mathematicians, sportsmen, such as former England cricket captain Mike Atherton, former Lancashire Captain, Mark Chilton, and former Lancashire and England batsman, John Crawley, several notable writers, such as Thomas de Quincey, playwright Robert Bolt, author Alan Garner, after whom the school's Junior Library is named, and journalist and broadcaster Martin Sixsmith. Other Old Mancunians are John Charles Polanyi (b. 1929) who won the 1986 Nobel Prize for Chemistry, chemist Michael Barber, actors Ben Kingsley and Robert Powell, historians Michael Wood and Victor Kiernan, popular science writer Brian Clegg, concert organist Daniel Moult, comic Chris Addison, and cryptographers Clifford Cocks, Peter Twinn and Malcolm J. Williamson. Theatre director Nicholas Hytner and the pianist John Ogdon are Old Mancunians. Mathematician and Fields Medalist Sir Michael Atiyah was also educated at the school for two years. One of the first Indian poets of English language, Manmohan Ghose, is also an Old Mancunian. Captain John Stanley (1750-1783) who was aide-de-camp to General John Burgoyne during the American War of Independence was also educated at the school.

== High Masters ==
For full details of High Masters up to 1990 with biographical sketches see Bentley. The names and dates of High Masters are also listed in the entrance hall of MGS.

- 1515–
  - William Pleasington
  - William Hinde
  - James Plumtree
- 1534–
  - Richard Bradshaw
  - Thomas Wrench
  - William Jackson
- 1547–
  - Edward Pendleton
  - William Terrill
  - James Bateson
  - Richard Raynton
- 1583– Thomas Cogan
- 1597– Edward Chetham
- 1606– Edward Clayton
- 1616– John Rowlands
- 1630– Thomas Harrison
- 1637– Robert Symonds
- 1638– Ralph Brideoake
- 1645– Nehemiah Paynter
- 1652– John Wickens
- 1676– Daniel Hill
- 1677– William Barrow
- 1720– Thomas Colburn
- 1722– John Richards
- 1727– Henry Brook
- 1749– William Purnell
- 1764– Charles Lawson
- 1807– Jeremiah Smith
- 1838– Robinson Elsdale
- 1840– John William Richards
- 1842– Nicholas Germon
- 1859– Frederick William Walker
- 1877– Samuel Dill
- 1888– Michael George Glazebrook
- 1890– John Edward King
- 1903– John Lewis Paton
- 1924– Douglas Gordon Miller
- 1945– Eric John Francis James (later Lord James of Rusholme)
- 1962– Peter Geoffrey Mason
- 1978– David Maland
- 1985– James Geoffrey Parker
- 1994– George Martin Stephen
- 2004– Christopher Ray
- 2013– Martin Boulton

== Junior School Headmistresses ==
- 2008 – Linda Hamilton
- 2021 – Eleanor Losse

== Notable staff ==
- Peter Farquhar, author and murder victim.

== See also ==
- Hugh Oldham
- Hulme Trust
