= Rupert Jeffcoat =

Scottish musician and priest (born 1970)

Rupert Edward Elessing Jeffcoat (born 23 June 1970) is a Scottish organist, composer and Anglican priest.

== Early life and family ==
Jeffcoat, whose family's roots are in Birmingham, was born and raised in Edinburgh, Scotland. He was a chorister at St Mary's Cathedral in Edinburgh under Dennis Townhill before attending Glenalmond College as a music scholar. He later studied music at St Catharine's College, Cambridge, where he was also an organ scholar, studying under Peter Hurford, David Sanger, Robin Holloway, Hugh Wood and Alexander Goehr.

Jeffcoat became a Fellow of the Royal College of Organists at the age of 20.

In 2001, he married Catherine Corrigan in a service at Coventry Cathedral featuring some of his own compositions, and has three children.

== Career ==
Early in his career Jeffcoat held positions with the Edinburgh International Festival (premiering operas by James MacMillan and Craig Armstrong), Ampleforth College in Yorkshire and the Birmingham Bach Choir under Paul Spicer.

He became Assistant Organist at St Philip's Cathedral, Birmingham, under Marcus Huxley, in 1995 and was appointed Director of Music at Coventry Cathedral in 1997. At Coventry he led choir tours to Europe, America, South Africa, Russia and Japan. In 2005, he moved to Australia as Organist and Director of Music at St John's Cathedral, Brisbane, but left the post in 2010 following disagreements with the cathedral authorities.

He was ordained to the priesthood at St John's Cathedral in 2006, having trained at The Queen's Foundation in Edgbaston, England. He has also been published as a theologian by Epworth Press, in a symposium entitled The Edge of God (2008).

As a composer Jeffcoat has composed in numerous languages, including English, Welsh, German, Dutch, Russian, Hungarian, Czech, Arabic, Aramaic, Vietnamese and Maori, as well as the more usual liturgical languages (Latin, Greek, Hebrew and Church Slavonic). As an organist and pianist he has performed widely, recording with Emma Kirkby (music by Francesco Scarlatti) and giving recitals on some of the world's most prestigious organs such as those at Westminster Cathedral, Liverpool Cathedral, St Giles Cathedral in Edinburgh, Queen's College in Oxford, Sydney Town Hall, Caird Hall in Dundee and Lambertikirche in Münster.

Special achievements include two Firsts in music from Cambridge, prizes from the Royal College of Organists and a Best Entertainment award from the Royal Television Society (for a BBC Songs of Praise programme).

== Works ==
=== Compositions (selected) ===
Jeffcoat has composed over 200 works, as well as numerous psalm chants.

- 1998, Missa Jacet Granum for Canterbury Cathedral.
- 2000, Here is my servant, composed for the National Service commemorating the work of the Home Front attended by HM the Queen, the Archbishop of Canterbury and the Prime Minister.
- 2000, Third Service, a setting of the Magnificat and Nunc Dimittis (in Gb and F# respectively) and broadcast frequently on BBC Radio 3.
- 2000, The Prophet, a setting for choir, organ, trumpet and congregation of the translation by Ted Hughes of a paraphrase by Pushkin of a biblical text from Isaiah.
- 2000, Laudate Dominum for two-part trebles, two pianos and organ, composed for the International Church Music Festival, Coventry.
- 2000, Abun devashmayyo, a setting of the Lord's Prayer in Aramaic.
- 2001, Mass for Oakham.
- 2002, Advent Calendar, a setting for violin and processing choir of words by Rowan Williams, Archbishop of Canterbury.
- 2008, Toccatarama!, a palimpsest of 26 French Organ toccatas. (The composers' dates are listed as 1835–1992.)
- 2009, The Disciples Awakening for 12 string players composed for the Consecration of Brisbane Cathedral, 29 October.

=== Recordings ===
- 2004, Rupert Jeffcoat Plays Organ Music From Coventry (Regent Records)
- 2005, La Nativité (Regent Records), collection of Christmas music by Messiaen, Harvey, Leighton.

Preceded by David Poulter	Director of Music, Coventry Cathedral; 1997 – 2005	Succeeded by Kerry Beaumont
