= John Dowling (RAF officer) =

- Born: 5 July 1923; Manchester, England
- Died: July 2000
- Military career
- Allegiance: United Kingdom
- Branch: Royal Air Force
- Service years: 1941–1978
- Rank: Wing Commander
- Nickname: "Mr Helicopter"
- Commands: No. 72 Squadron (1961–62)
- Conflicts: Second World War; Berlin Airlift; Malayan Emergency; Indonesia–Malaysia confrontation
- Awards: Member of the Order of the British Empire; Distinguished Flying Cross & Bar; Air Force Cross; Mentioned in Despatches

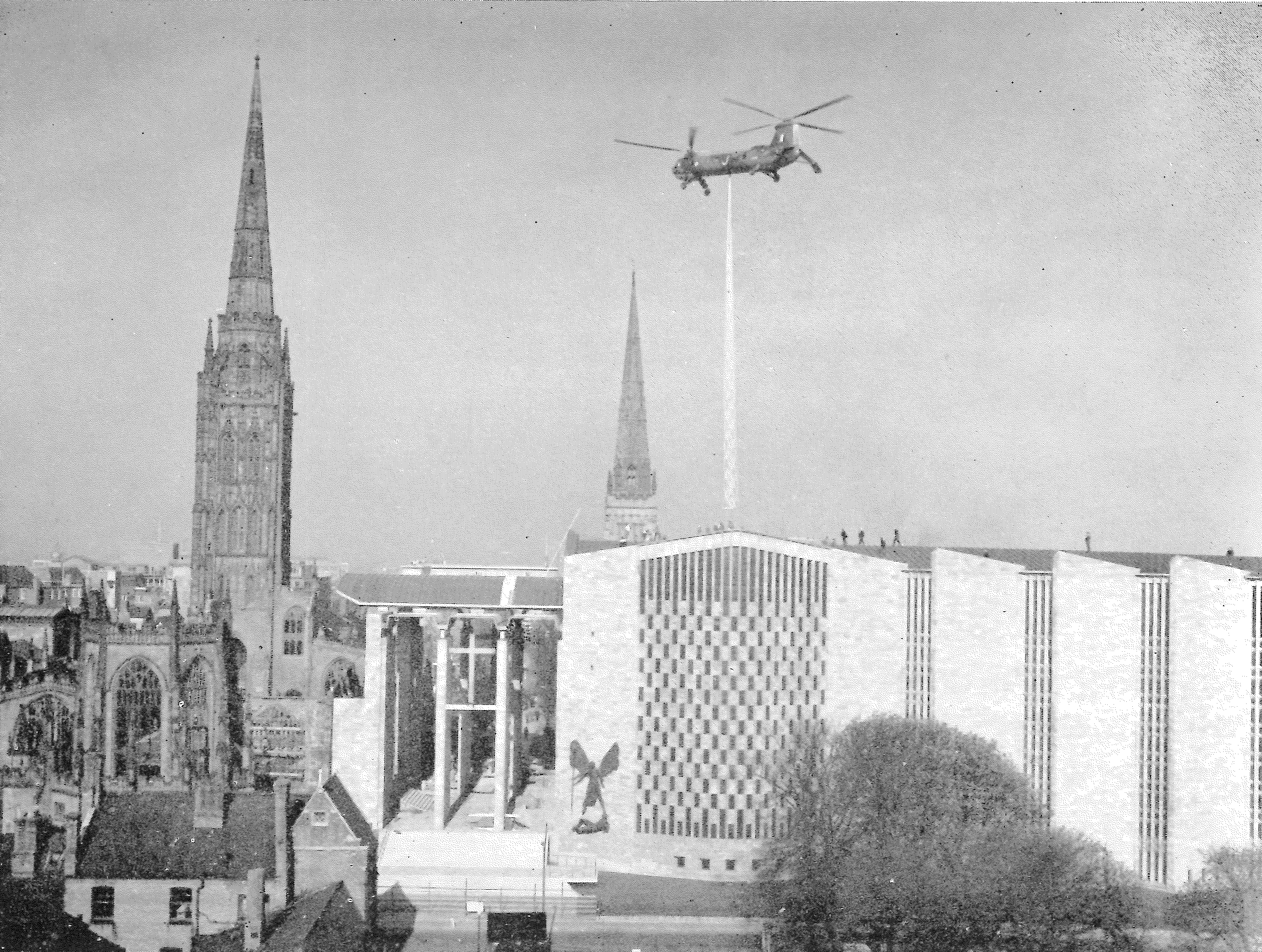
Dowling used a Bristol Belvedere helicopter to place the spire at Coventry Cathedral

Wing Commander John Reginald Dowling, MBE, DFC & Bar, AFC (5 July 1923 – July 2000) was a Royal Air Force (RAF) officer and helicopter pilot famous for placing the spire of the rebuilt Coventry Cathedral on 22 April 1962. He was a Lancaster bomber pilot during the Second World War, and the author of RAF Helicopters: The First Twenty Years, a comprehensive overview of the RAF's early helicopters and their uses.

Dowling was born in Withington Manchester, the son of Dr Stephen Dowling and Mrs Kathleen Dowling (née Gilmore). One of four children, he was educated at Ampleforth College and practised Catholicism all of his life.
