= Kerry Beaumont =

British organist and music director

Kerry Jason Beaumont (born 5 April 1957) is a British organist and choir director.

== Early life and training ==
Born in Cambridge, England, Beaumont later emigrated to Canada with his family. He earned his undergraduate degree from the Curtis Institute in Philadelphia and also has a Master of Arts from Durham University.

== Career ==
Beaumont was Director of Music at the Church of the Good Samaritan in Paoli, Pennsylvania, United States, for seven years (1981-1988) before returning to the United Kingdom.

He then served as Organist and Master of the Choristers at St Davids Cathedral in Wales from 1990 to 1994 and at Ripon Cathedral in England from 1994 to 2002 before being appointed Director of Music at Coventry Cathedral, a position he held from 2006 to 2020. Upon his retirement from Coventry he was made Organist Emeritus of the Cathedral, and the following year he was awarded the Cranmer Award for Worship by the Archbishop of Canterbury for his "outstanding service to music and worship ..., with particular reference at Coventry to outreach, recruitment and nurture of boy and girl choristers to create a cathedral choir with diversity at its heart".

In 2021 he was appointed Director of Music at Holy Trinity Church in Leamington Spa.

== Recordings and concert performances ==
Beaumont's recordings as an organist and choirmaster are published by Priory Records, Herald AV Productions and Cantoris Records. As a member of SOCAN (the Society of Canadian Composers, Authors and Publishers) he has published several hundred recorded compositions through the programme music libraries of Omnimusic and the Parry Music Library. Of his church music there are published titles by Encore Publications and Banks Music Publications.

Preceded by Malcolm Watts	Organist and Master of the Choristers, St Davids Cathedral; 1990 – 1994	Succeeded by Geraint Bowen
Preceded by Ronald Edward Perrin	Organist and Master of the Choristers, Ripon Cathedral; 1994 – 2002	Succeeded by Simon Morley
Preceded by Rupert Jeffcoat	Director of Music, Coventry Cathedral; 2006 – 2020	Succeeded by Rachel Mahon
