= Rachel Mahon =

Canadian organist and director of music

Rachel Mahon is a Canadian organist who has served as Director of Music at Coventry Cathedral, England, since 2020, having previously held positions at Truro Cathedral, St Paul's Cathedral and Chester Cathedral.

== Early life and training ==
Mahon was raised in Toronto, Ontario, where her parents were both choral directors. She sang with the girls' choir of Grace Church on-the-Hill and later the Oratory Children's Choir.

She initially began studying piano, but switched to organ in 2005 after hearing the Toccata from Symphony for Organ No. 5 by Charles-Marie Widor. Mahon won a scholarship from the Royal Canadian College of Organists (RCCO) to begin studying with Melva Graham, and in 2007 continued under Andrew Ager. She received the degree of Bachelor of Music in organ at the University of Toronto School of Music under John Tuttle.

== Career ==
Mahon held organ posts at St. James Cathedral, Trinity College and Timothy Eaton Memorial Church in Toronto before moving to England for a post at Truro Cathedral in Cornwall.

In September 2014 Mahon became the first female organ scholar at St Paul's Cathedral, London. As the William and Irene Miller Organ Scholar, she was responsible for directing choir rehearsals, performing for church services, playing in recitals and acting as assistant choir librarian, among other duties.

She later served as Assistant Organist at Chester Cathedral before becoming Assistant Director of Music at Coventry Cathedral in 2018. In February 2020, it was announced that she would succeed Kerry Beaumont as Director of Music at Coventry Cathedral.

Mahon is a performing professional musician and has performed with a number of choirs, including the Toronto Mendelssohn Choir, the Larkin Singers, and the Tallis Choir, among others. She is also one of the Canadian organ duo Organized Crime, which "attempts to reinvigorate the instrument by arranging popular music for the organ, playing scores to James Bond and Star Wars wearing five-inch stiletto heels and blue sequined spandex."

== Awards ==
Mahon has won several awards for organ performance, including first place at the 2012 RCCO Toronto Competition for Young Organists, second in the 2013 Canadian National Organ Playing Competition, and a number of awards from the Kiwanis Music Festival.

| Preceded by Kerry Beaumont | Director of Music, Coventry Cathedral; 2020 – present | Succeeded by |
