= Coventry Chronicle =

The Coventry Chronicle is a 12th-century world chronicle in annual format covering the period from the Creation to the year 1122.

The manuscript was written by Benedictine monks at Coventry Cathedral Priory, about the year 1150, with an addendum up to 1202. Much of the material to 1150 is a reworking of the Chronica chronicarum by John of Worcester.

Today the document is at BL, Harley ms. 3775, fol. 34r-67v and 73r.
