= Philip Marshall =

English organist

Philip Marshall (born Joseph Philip Marshall; 1921–2005) was an English cathedral organist and composer. Kenneth Shenton of The Guardian praised his color and improvisational skills.

Marshall was born in Brighouse, Yorkshire. He served in the Royal Army Service Corps during World War II and was elected a fellow of the Royal College of Organists in 1946.

He was the organist at All Souls' Church, Halifax (1946-1951), St Botolph's Church, Boston (1951–1957), Ripon Cathedral (1957–1966) and Lincoln Cathedral (1966–1986). At Ripon, he created the cathedral choir school. His compositions included liturgical works, vocal compositions and instrumental works including a Concerto for Piano and Orchestra

He was awarded the BMus and DMus degrees through examination at Durham University, in the years 1950 and 1955 respectively.

Cultural offices
Preceded by Joseph Bernard Jackson 1927 - 1951	Organist and Master of the Choristers of St Botolph's Church, Boston; 1951 - 1957	Succeeded by David Arthur Wright
Preceded by Lionel Frederick Dakers	Organist and Master of the Choristers of Ripon Cathedral; 1957–1966	Succeeded by Ronald Edward Perrin
Preceded by Gordon Archbold Slater	Organist and Master of the Choristers of Lincoln Cathedral; 1966–1986	Succeeded by David Flood
