= Coventry Cathedral =

Cathedral in West Midlands, England

- Cathedral Church of Saint Michael
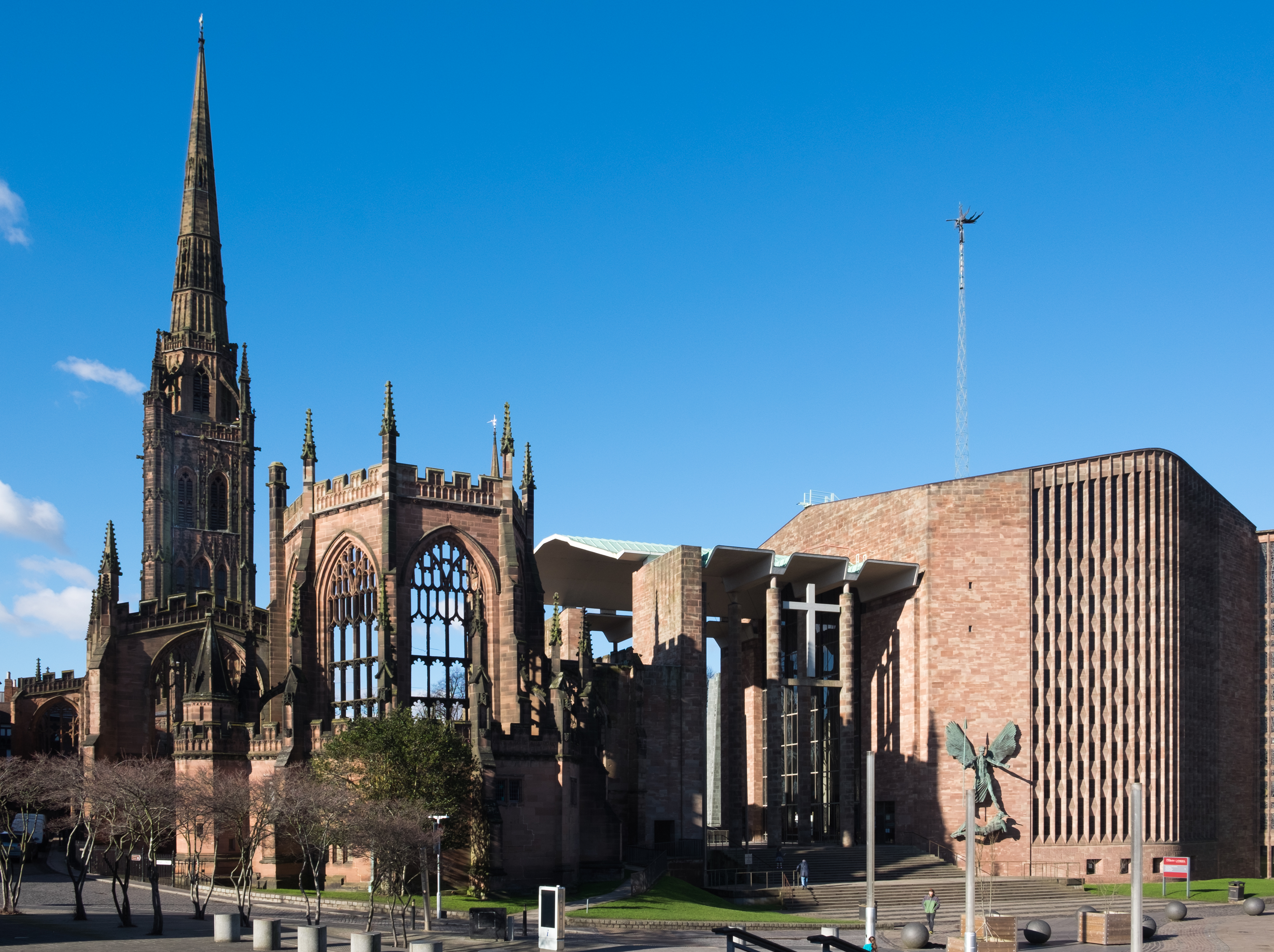
- Old (left) and new (right) cathedral buildings

- Shown within West Midlands
- 52°24′30″N 1°30′26″W
- OS grid reference: SP 33627 79065
- Location: Coventry city centre, West Midlands
- Country: England
- Denomination: Church of England
- Website: www.coventrycathedral.org.uk

History
- Dedication: St Michael
- Consecrated: 25 May 1962

Architecture
- Previous cathedrals: 2
- Architect: Basil Spence
- Style: Regional modern
- Years built: 1956–1962

Administration
- Province: Canterbury
- Diocese: Coventry

Clergy
- Bishop: Sophie Jelley
- Dean: John Witcombe

The Cathedral Church of Saint Michael, commonly known as Coventry Cathedral, is the seat of the Bishop of Coventry and the Diocese of Coventry within the Church of England. The cathedral is located in Coventry, West Midlands, England.

The city has had three cathedrals. The first was St Mary's, a monastic building, from 1102 to 1539, of which only a few ruins remain. The second was St Michael's, a 14th-century Gothic church designated as a cathedral in 1918, which remains a ruined shell after its bombing during the Second World War, apart from its tower and spire, which rise to 284 feet (87 metres). The third, consecrated in 1962, is the new St Michael's Cathedral, built immediately adjacent to the ruins and tower of the former cathedral – together forming both a symbol of war-time destruction and barbarity, and also of peace and reconciliation.

== St Mary's Priory ==
Coventry had a medieval cathedral that survived until the Reformation. This was St Mary's Priory and Cathedral, 1095 to 1102, when Robert de Limesey moved the bishop's see from Lichfield to Coventry, until 1539 when it fell victim to Henry VIII's dissolution of the monasteries. Prior to 1095, it had been a small Benedictine monastery (endowed by Leofric, Earl of Mercia and his wife Godiva in 1043). Shortly after 1095 rebuilding began and by the middle of the 13th century it was a cathedral of 142 yards (130 m) in length and included many large outbuildings. Leofric was probably buried within the original Saxon church in Coventry. However, records suggest that Godiva was buried at Evesham Abbey, alongside her father confessor, Prior Æfic. It was the only medieval cathedral to be demolished at the Reformation.

== St Michael's Cathedral ==
=== First structure ===
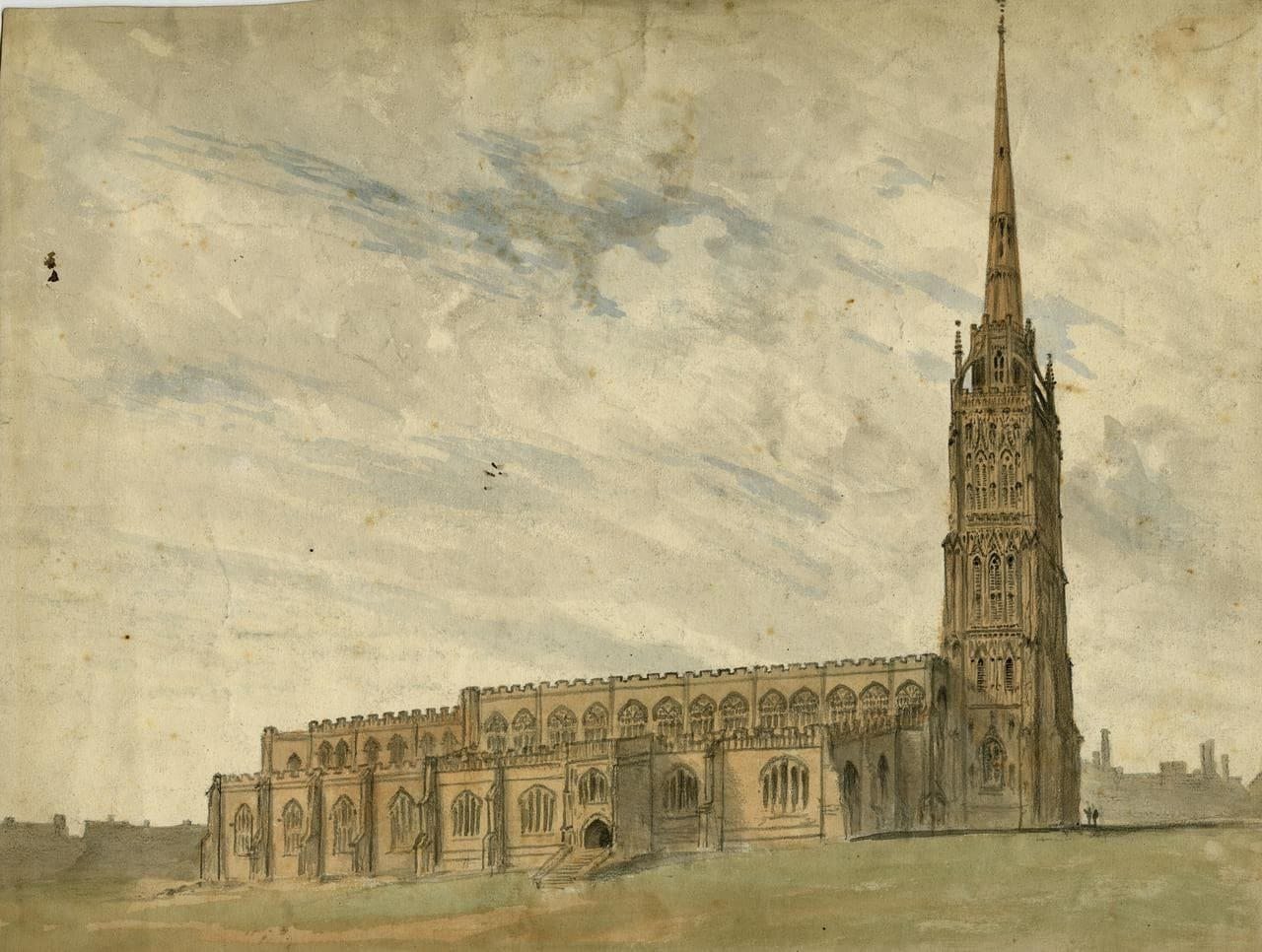
1802 watercolour by William Crotch

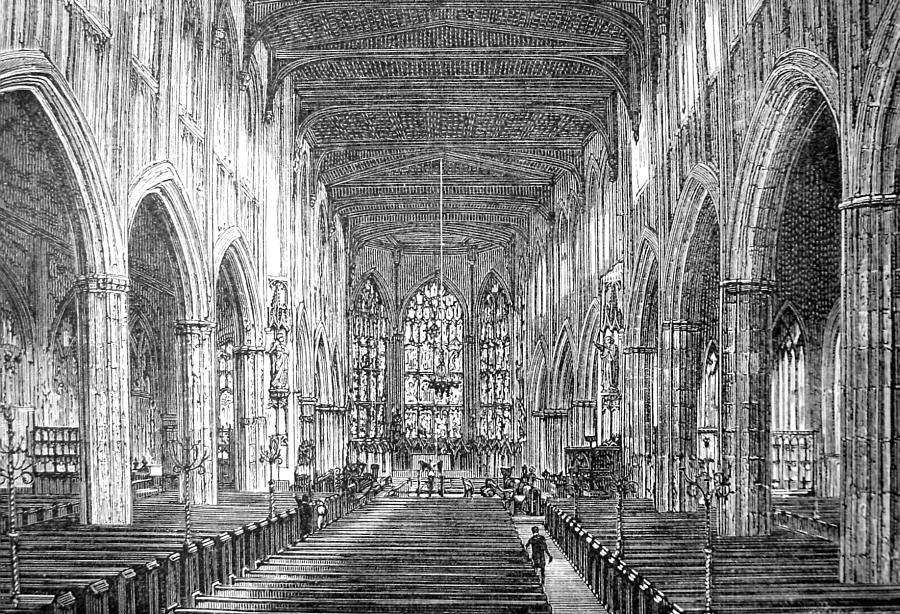
The interior of the old cathedral, c. 1880

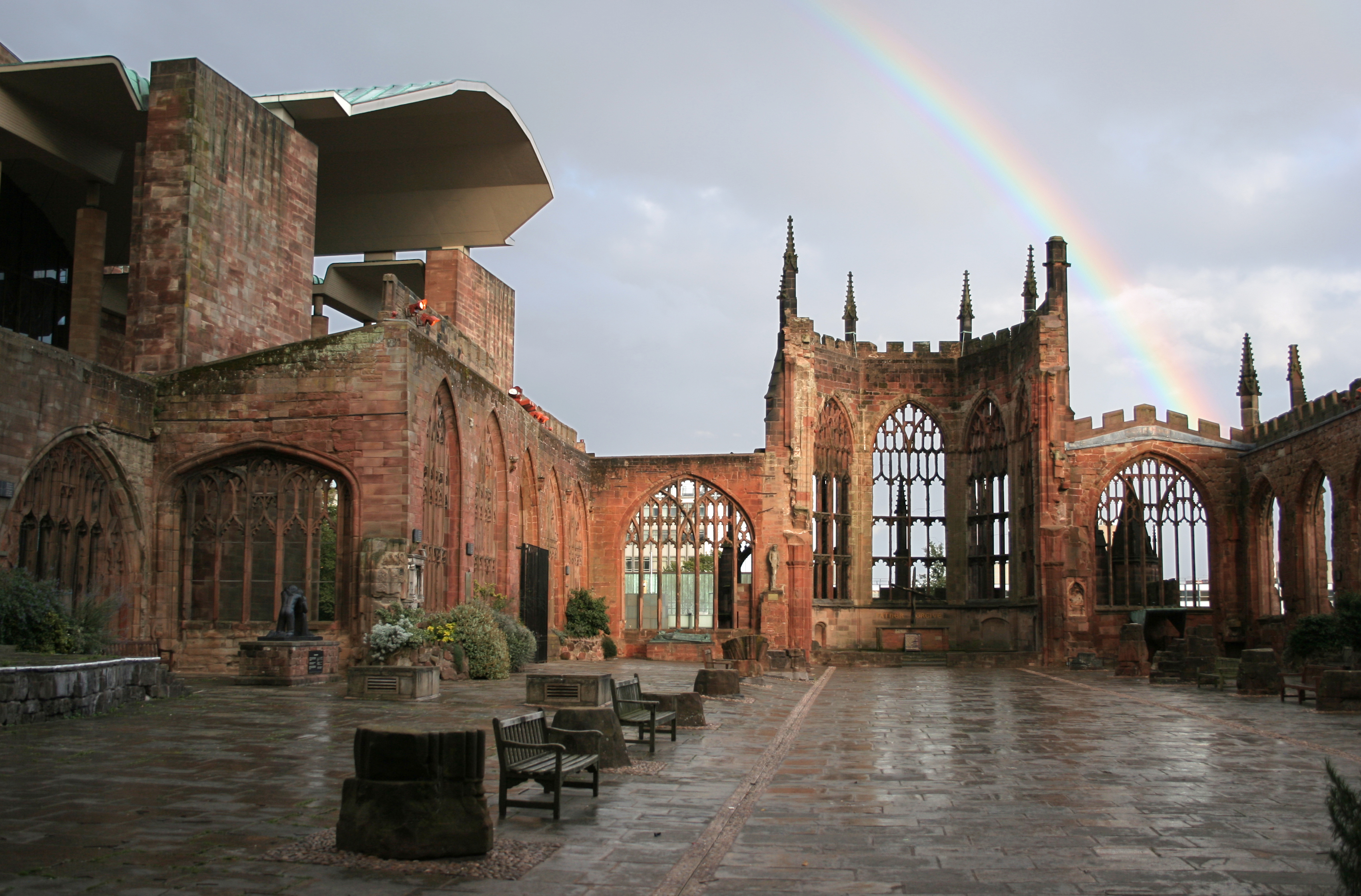
The roofless ruins of the old cathedral

St Michael's Church was largely constructed between the late 14th century and early 15th century from red sandstone. It was one of the largest parish churches in England when, in 1918, it was elevated to cathedral status on the creation of the Diocese of Coventry. This St Michael's Cathedral now stands ruined, bombed almost to destruction during the Coventry Blitz of 14 November 1940 by the German Luftwaffe. Only the tower, spire, the outer wall, and the bronze effigy and tomb of its first bishop, Huyshe Yeatman-Biggs, survived. The ruins of this older cathedral remain hallowed ground and are listed at Grade I. Following the bombing of the cathedral in 1940, Provost Richard Howard had the words "Father Forgive" inscribed on the wall behind the altar of the ruined building. The spire rises to 284 feet (87 metres) to the base of the weathervane, and is the tallest structure in the city. It is also the third tallest cathedral spire in England, with only Salisbury and Norwich cathedrals rising higher. When the height of the weathervane is included, it is 290 feet (88 metres) high.

=== Present structure ===
The current St Michael's Cathedral, built next to the remains of the old one, was designed by Basil Spence and Arup, was built by John Laing and is a Grade I listed building.

The selection of Spence for the work was a result of a competition held in 1950 to find an architect for the new Coventry Cathedral; his design was chosen from over two hundred submitted. Spence (later knighted for this work) insisted that instead of rebuilding the old cathedral, it should be kept in ruins as a garden of remembrance and that the new cathedral should be built alongside, the two buildings together effectively forming one church. The use of Hollington sandstone for the new Coventry Cathedral provides an element of unity between the buildings.

The foundation stone of the new cathedral was laid by Queen Elizabeth II on 23 March 1956. The unconventional spire or flèche is 80 feet (24 m) tall and was lowered onto the flat roof by a helicopter, flown by Wing Commander John Dowling in April 1962.

The cathedral was consecrated on 25 May 1962 by Cuthbert Bardsley, Bishop of Coventry with Benjamin Britten's War Requiem, composed for the occasion, premiered in the new cathedral on 30 May to mark its consecration.

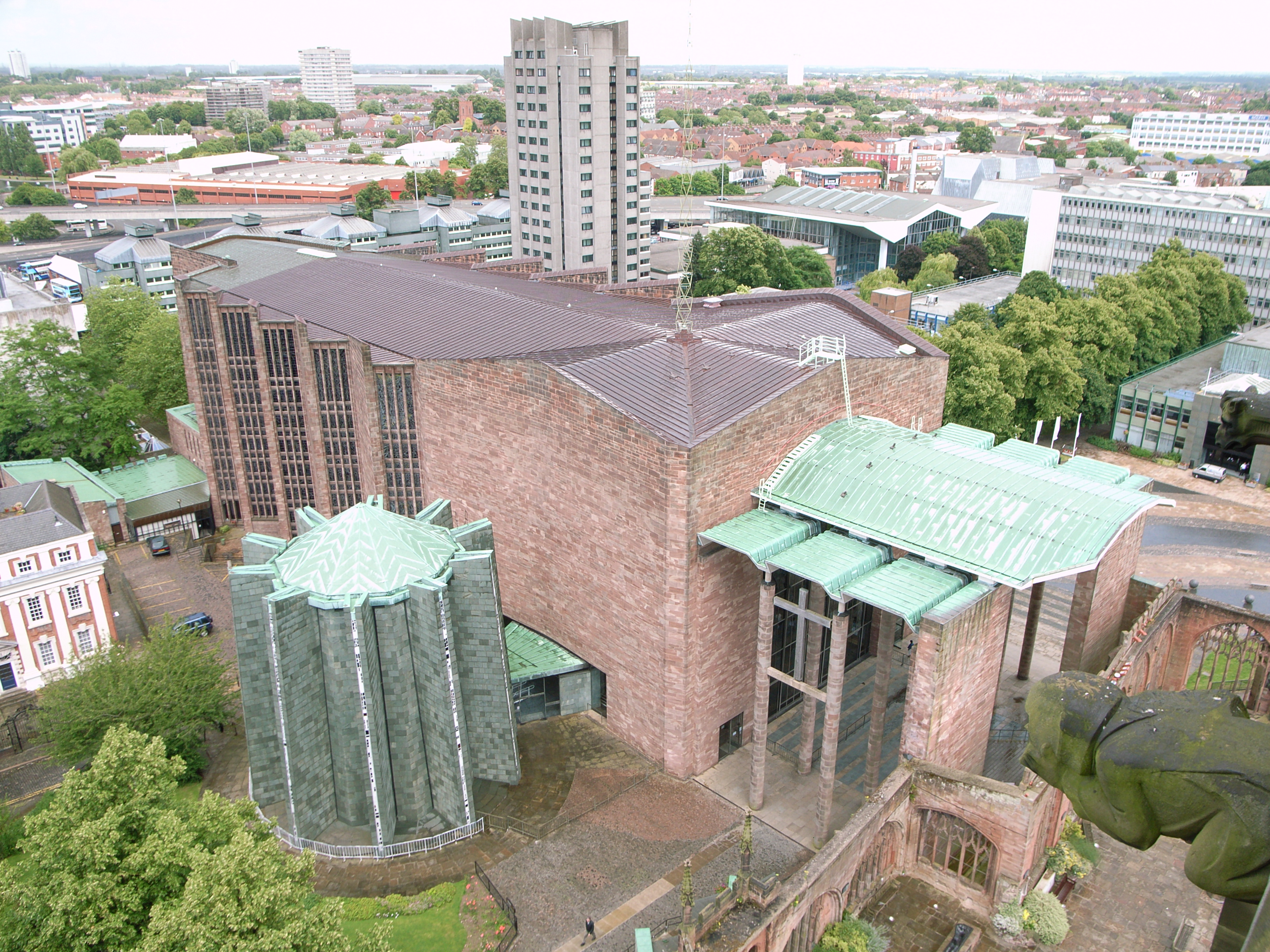
The new cathedral as seen from the tower of the old cathedral. The chapter-house is centre-left.

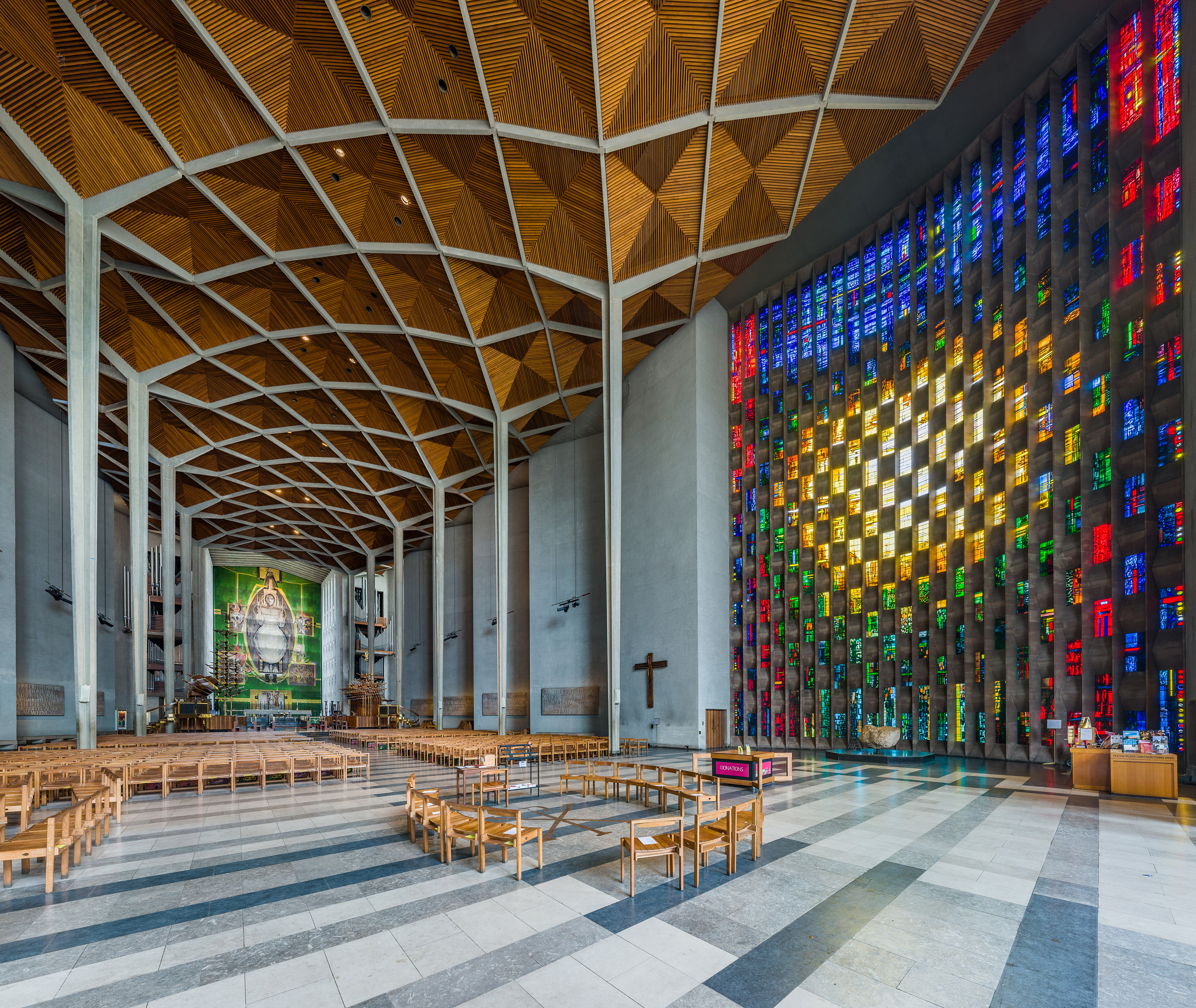
The interior of the new cathedral, showing its multi-coloured stained glass at right

=== Modern art ===
To complement its modern architecture, Spence's vision for Coventry's new cathedral required that it be filled with the best examples of contemporary art, in his own words, "like a casket of jewels". Many were commissioned by Spence himself early on in his planning of the cathedral, the architect working directly with the artists to ensure that each individual artwork contributed to the integrity of the whole. As a result, the cathedral is famous for its significant collection of mainly British mid-20th century artworks by some of the UK's most noteworthy post-war artists. These include:

- Jacob Epstein's St Michael’s Victory over the Devil, a monumental bronze sculpture affixed to the exterior of the east wall of the cathedral. It depicts the Archangel Michael triumphant over a bound Satan, symbolising the victory of good over evil in the post-war rebuilding of Coventry. The work stands over 7m high, with Michael’s wings spanning the same width. Completed shortly before Epstein’s death in 1959, the sculpture was unveiled at the cathedral’s consecration in 1962.
- A huge tapestry titled Christ in Glory in the Tetramorph, designed by Graham Sutherland. At 23 metres tall and 12 metres wide, it was once thought to be the world's largest tapestry, made in one single piece. Located on the liturgical east wall of the Lady Chapel, it dominates the view from the entrance of the nave. The tapestry depicts the risen Christ in the glory of God in Heaven within a mandorla, surrounded by symbols of the four Evangelists. Its design and creation was an immense technical challenge for Sutherland. Commissioned in 1951 the design and manufacture was developed over the course of 10 years and only installed in 1962 ahead of the cathedral's consecration. It was woven by hand in Aubusson in France on a 500-year-old loom made from two tree trunks from one continuous piece of wool.
- The Baptistry window designed by John Piper, who as an official war artist had painted the ruins of the old cathedral in 1940. Likened to a tapering curtain of coloured light, this monumental floor-to-ceiling window, 21.9m high and 18m wide, consists of 198 individual stained glass panes set into a convex concrete chequerboard frame designed by Spence. Piper worked in collaboration with glassmaker Patrick Reyntiens, with whom he would go on to forge a near 40 year partnership. To create unity on such a scale, Piper used dazzling colour and individual abstract patterns that are unique to each panel and combine to give the overall impression of a dazzling yellow sunburst to the centre. The primarily blue glass above and green below creates a scene reminiscent of sunrise, an appropriate metaphor for both the window's setting in the baptistry and the new cathedral itself, rising from the ruins of the old. The window was commissioned from Piper and Reyntiens by the Coventry Cathedral Reconstruction Committee in 1955 and manufactured over the course of three years from 1958 to 1961.
- Ten stained glass windows in the nave, by Lawrence Lee, Keith New and Geoffrey Clarke, which are angled to face towards the altar and away from the congregation. Spence's concept for these windows was that opposite pairs would represent a pattern of growth from birth to old age, culminating in heavenly glory nearest the altar—one side representing Human, the other side, the Divine. The commission was led by Lee, who enlisted New and Clarke, two recent graduates from the Royal College of Art, as collaborators rather than assistants. The three artists worked individually on three windows each and together on the tenth. Treating the windows as pairs, New designed the green windows representing youth, Lee worked on the red and gold windows symbolising early manhood, and Clarke designed the purple windows depicting wisdom and old age.
- The Great West Window known as the Screen of Saints and Angels, depicting 66 saints and angels engraved directly into the individual glass panes in an expressionist style by John Hutton. Located at the entrance of the new cathedral It acts as both a wall and a window, linking the old cathedral with the new, ensuring that the ruins are visible from inside and providing a reminder of the path from destruction to resurrection. A pane of the Hutton window, depicting The Angel with the Eternal Gospel, was smashed during a burglary in January 2020. Another was cracked by a ladder during the set-up for an externally-organised musical event in 2026.
- Eight massive stone panels set into the walls of the nave, known as the Tablets of the Word, carved in-situ by the émigré German letter carver Ralph Beyer. Their deliberately irregular lettering was inspired by early Christian inscriptions, especially as seen in Roman crypts. Beyer also carved the foundation stone, the baptismal font (made from a boulder sourced in Bethlehem) and the greeting set into the floor of the nave.
- Three sculptures in bronze by Geoffrey Clarke: The High Altar Cross cast in an organic form reminiscent of a tree or bird, which to its centre holds the Cross of Nails, made from three medieval roof nails salvaged from the rubble of the old Cathedral after its destruction, from which Clarke took inspiration for its gnarled form; the bronze Crown of Thorns sculpture that hangs centrally above the altar in the Chapel of Christ the Servant, and; the bronze winged cross sculpture that crowns the 26 metre flèche that climbs above the roof.
- The lectern bookrest in the form of an eagle, cast in bronze by the sculptor Elisabeth Frink, Frink's first major commission, she modelled the eagle directly in plaster and, using ordinary kindling wood, gave the effect of feathers. The result is an entirely original take on a traditional piece of liturgical furniture.
- An emotive sculpture of the Mater Dolorosa, made in 1970 by John Bridgeman in the Lady Chapel.
- The Swedish windows located in the Lady Chapel, a gift of the people of Sweden, made by Einar Forseth and installed in 1961. Forseth used traditional stained glass techniques in an accessible, Modernist style. Forseth also designed the mosaic floor in the Chapel of Unity.
- A mosaic in the Chapel of Christ in Gethsemane by Steven Sykes, depicting the Angel of Agony that is first seen from outside the chapel through a wrought-iron screen in the form of the Crown of Thorns, designed by Spence himself.
- Margaret Traherne's stained-glass windows in the Chapel of Unity. Executed in the dalle-de-verre technique, these narrow slits of coloured glass transform sunlight into vibrant hues that wash across the chapel’s interior concrete surfaces, creating a contemplative, spiritual atmosphere.
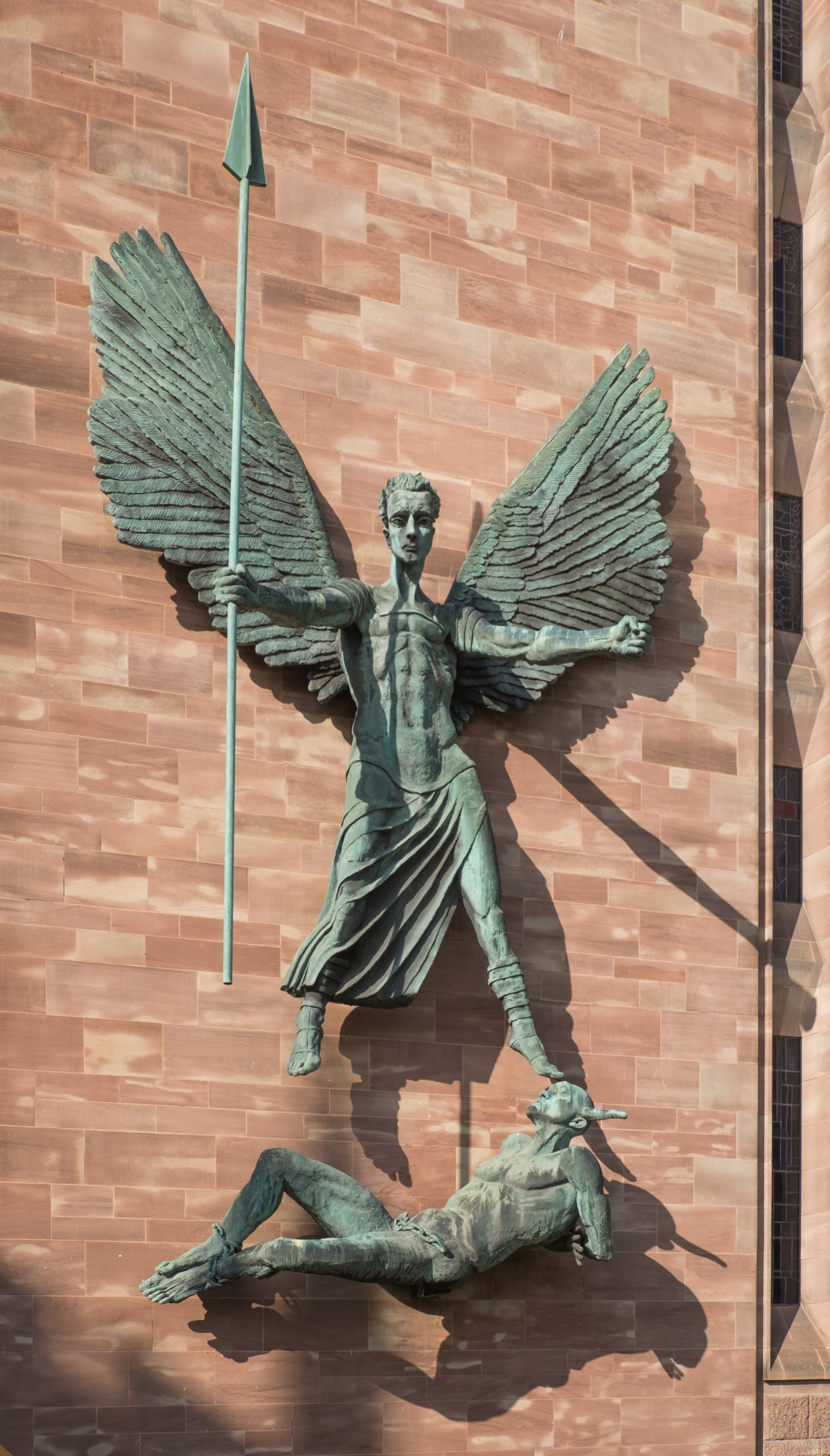
St Michael's Victory over the Devil, bronze sculpture by Jacob Epstein

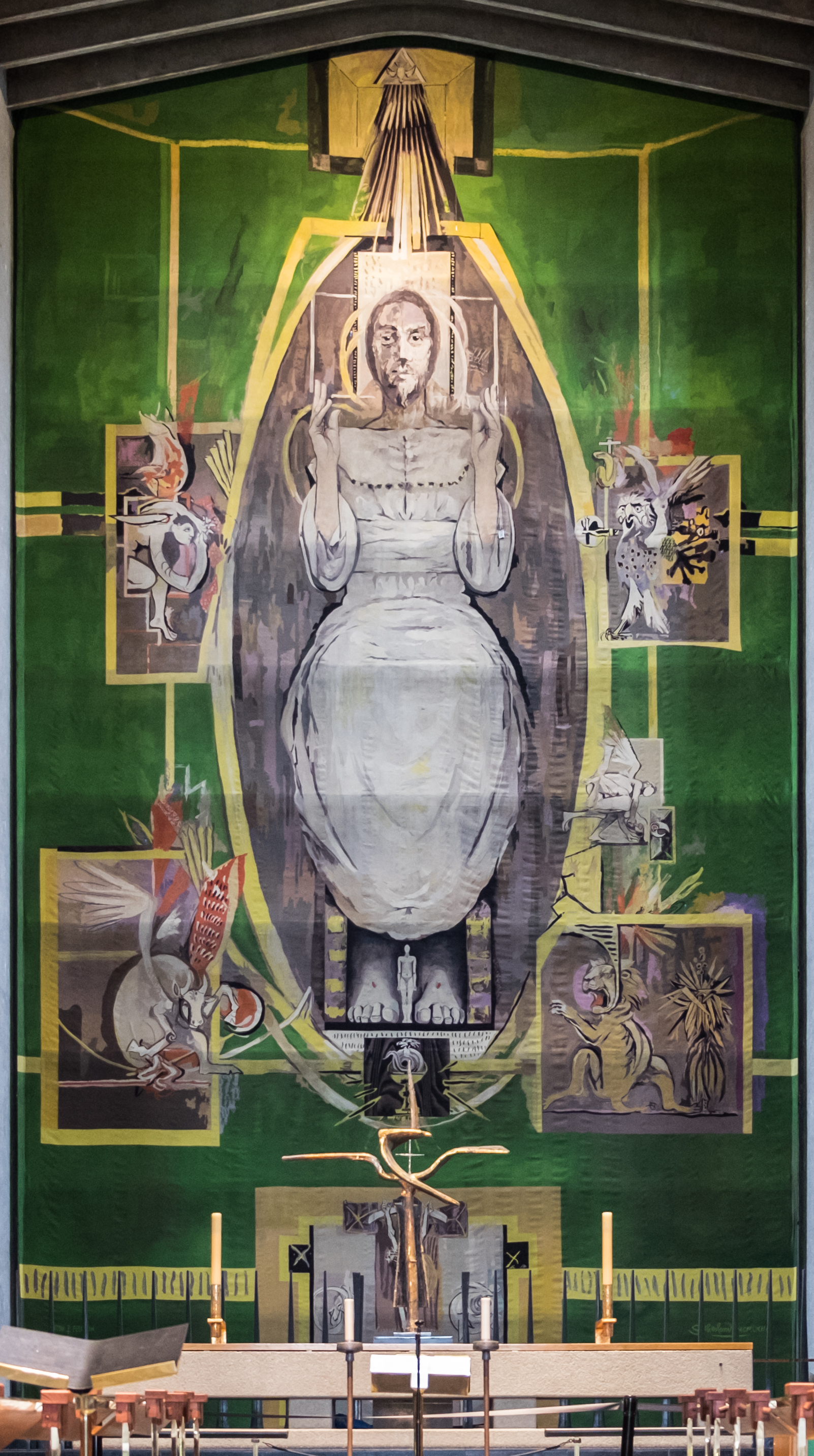
Christ in Glory in the Tetramorph, tapestry by Graham Sutherland

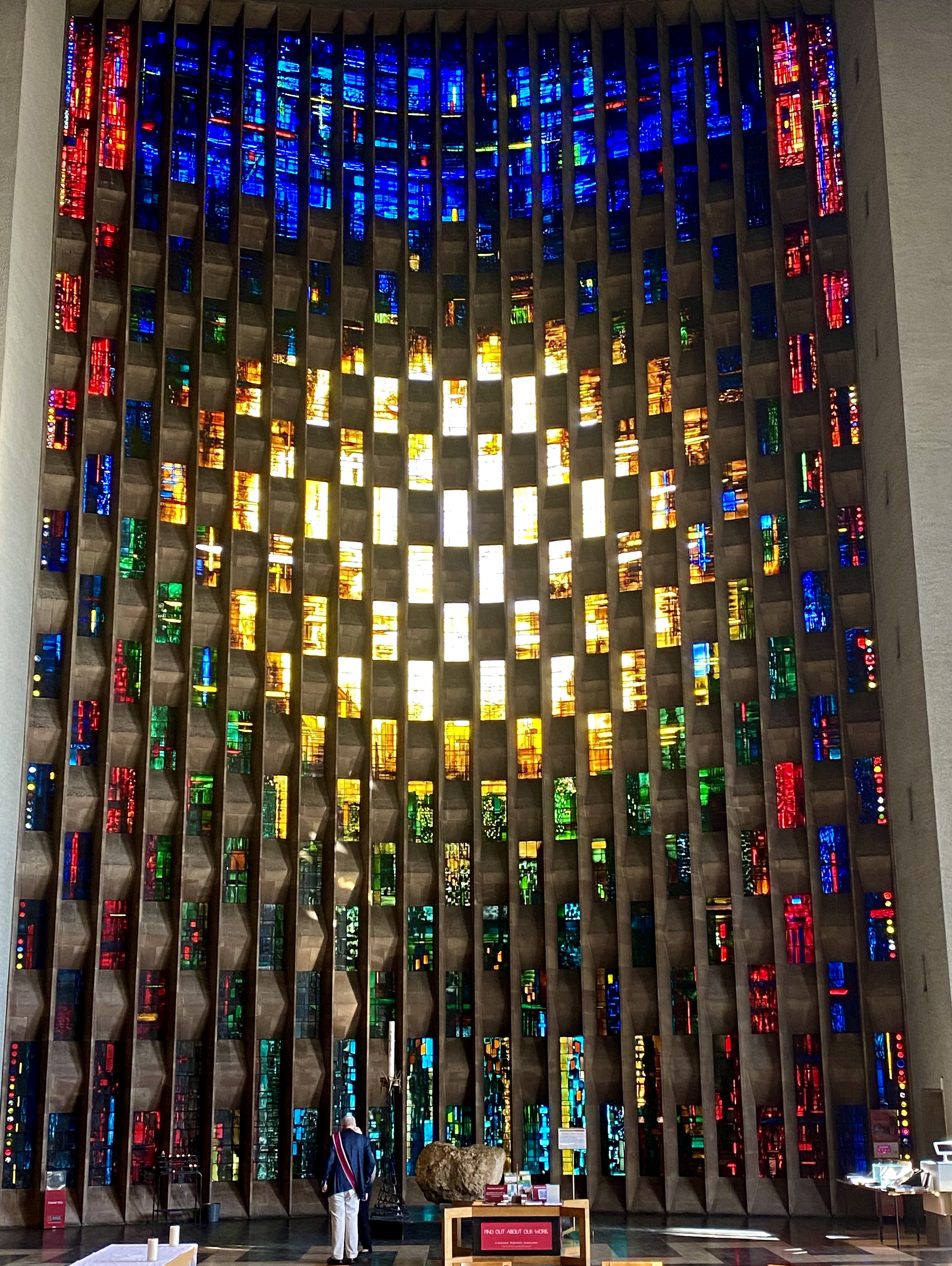
Baptistry window by John Piper and Patrick Reyntiens

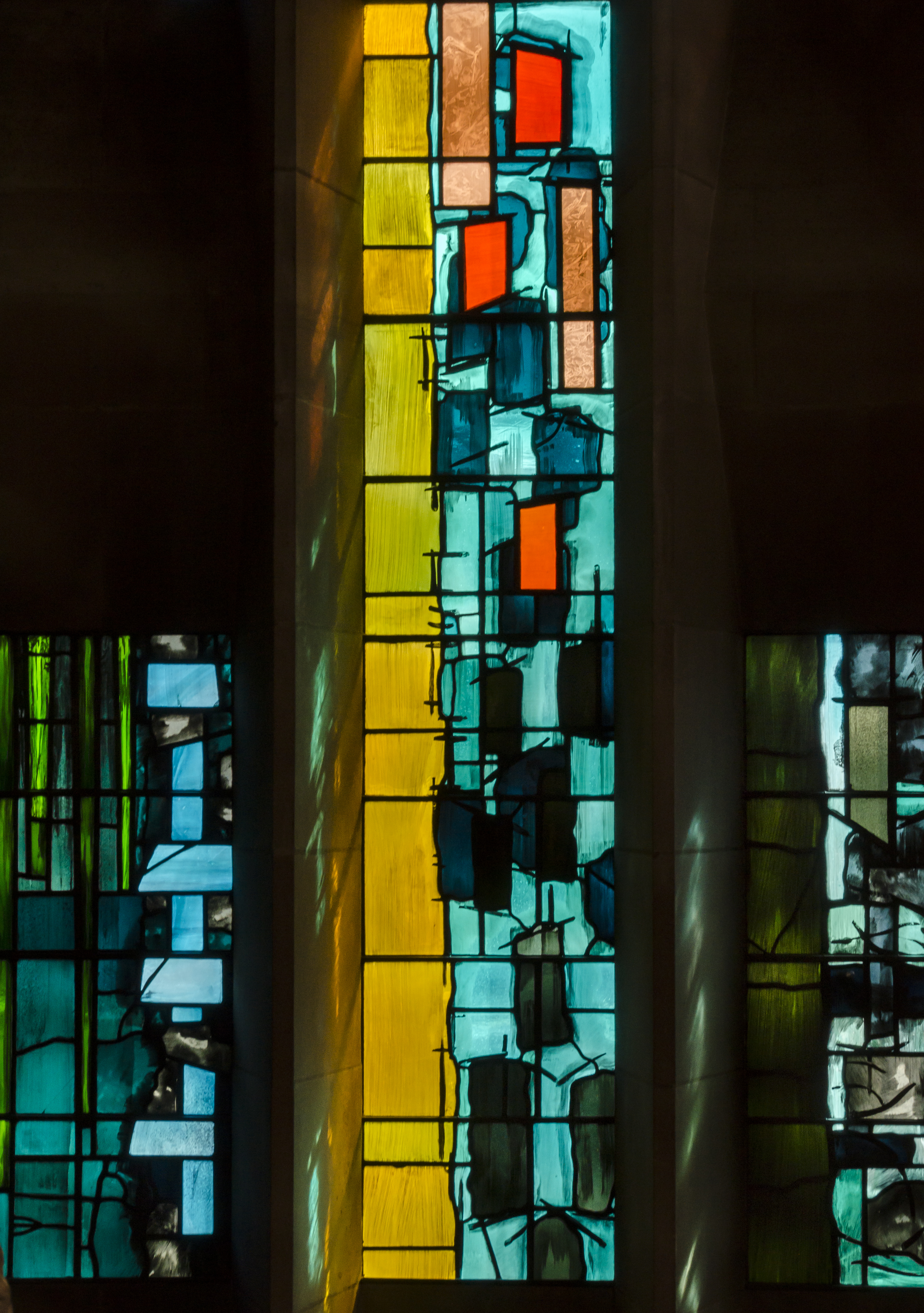
Baptistry window, detail

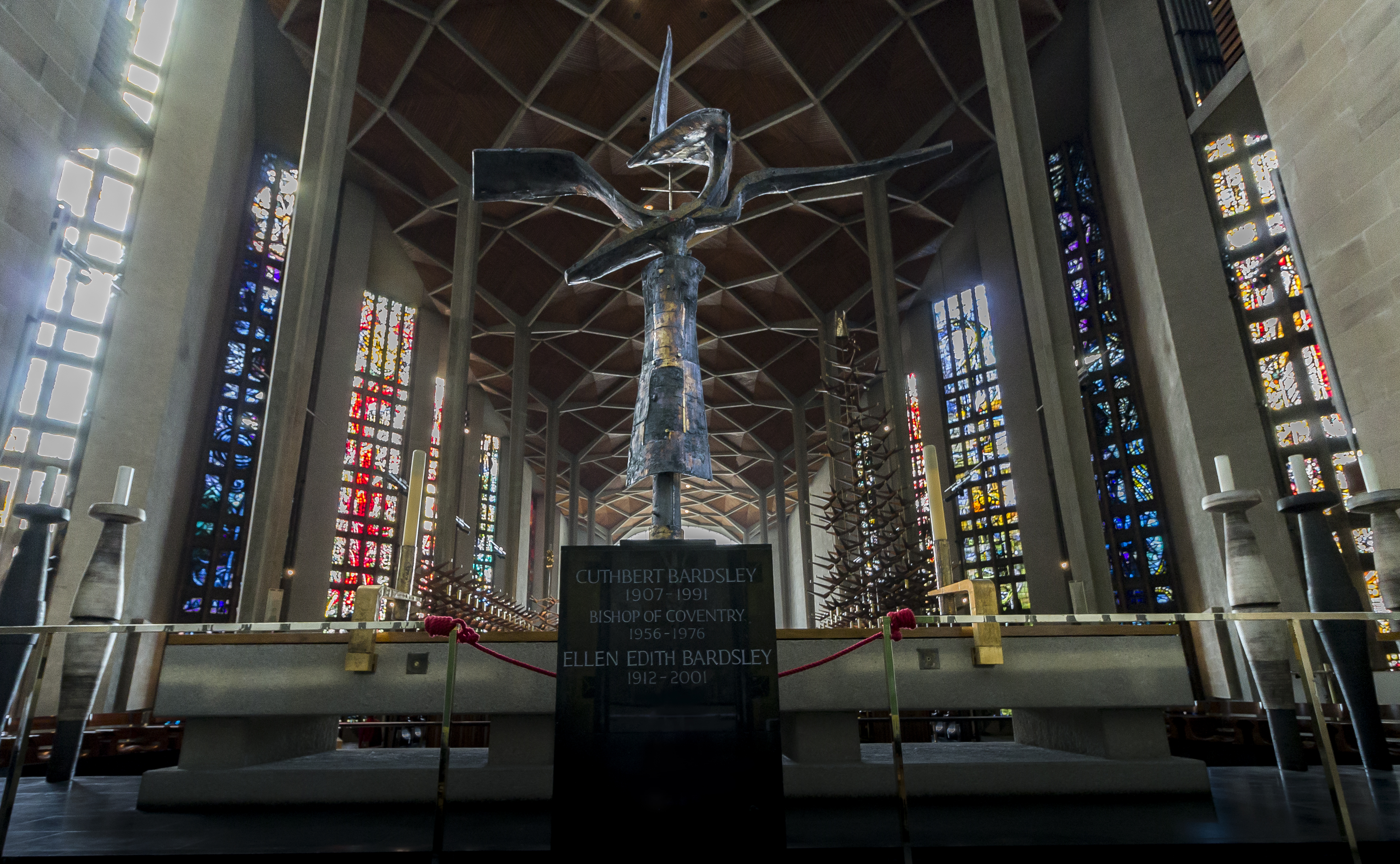
View from altar, showing stained glass windows by Lawrence Lee, Keith New and Geoffrey Clarke, and Clarke's bronze Altar Cross.

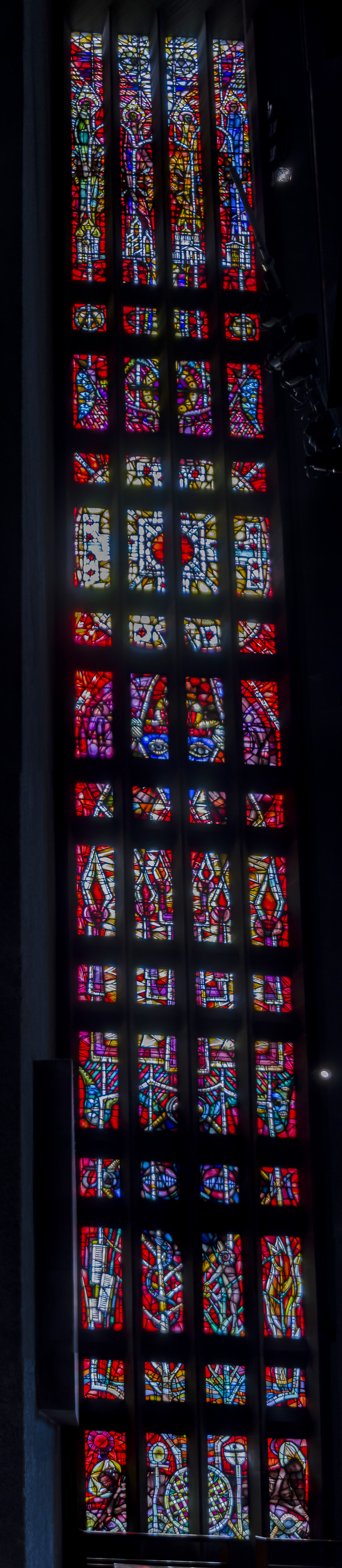
Nave window by Lawrence Lee.

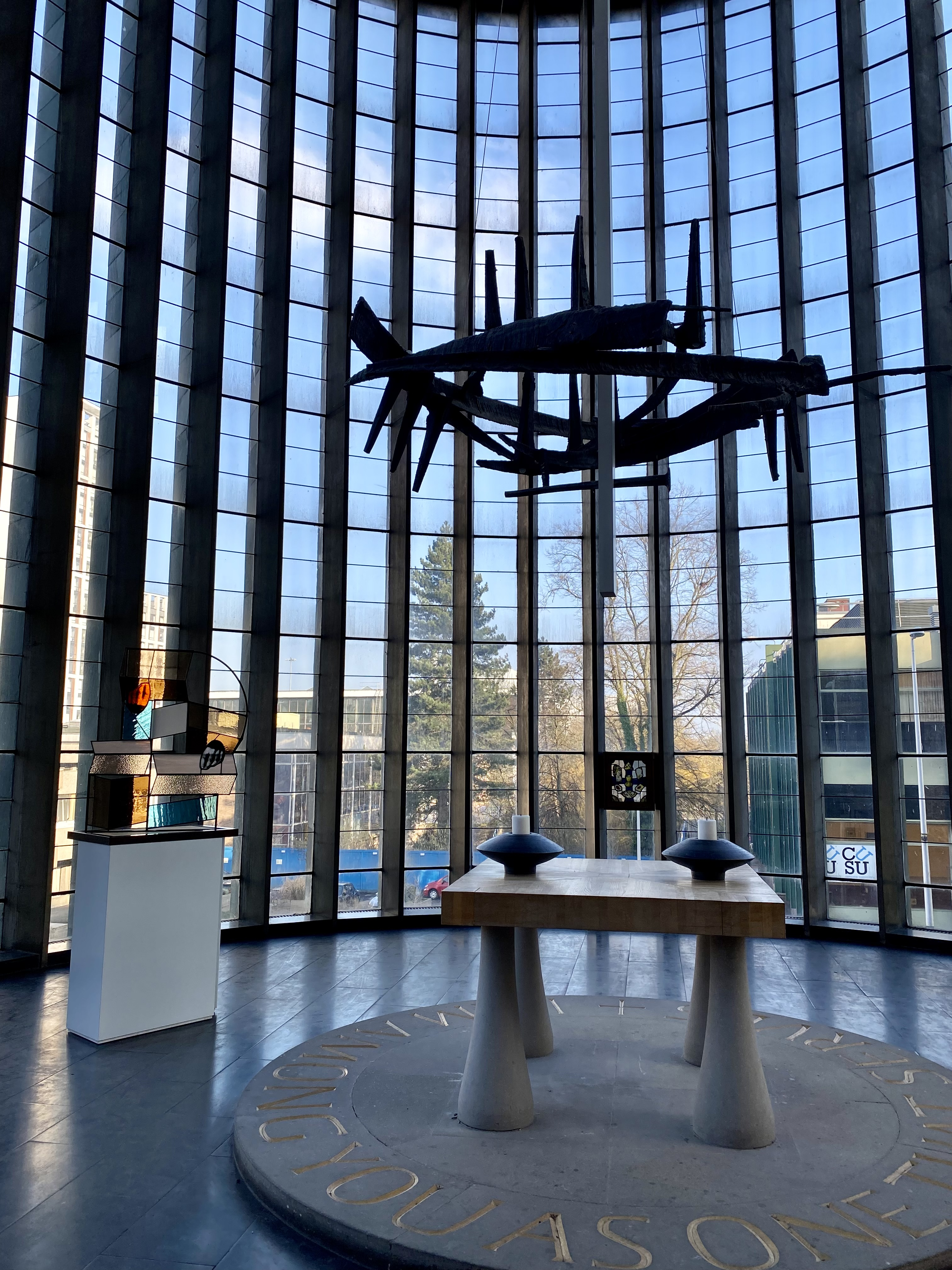
Geoffrey Clarke's bronze Crown of Thorns in the Chapel of Christ the Servant

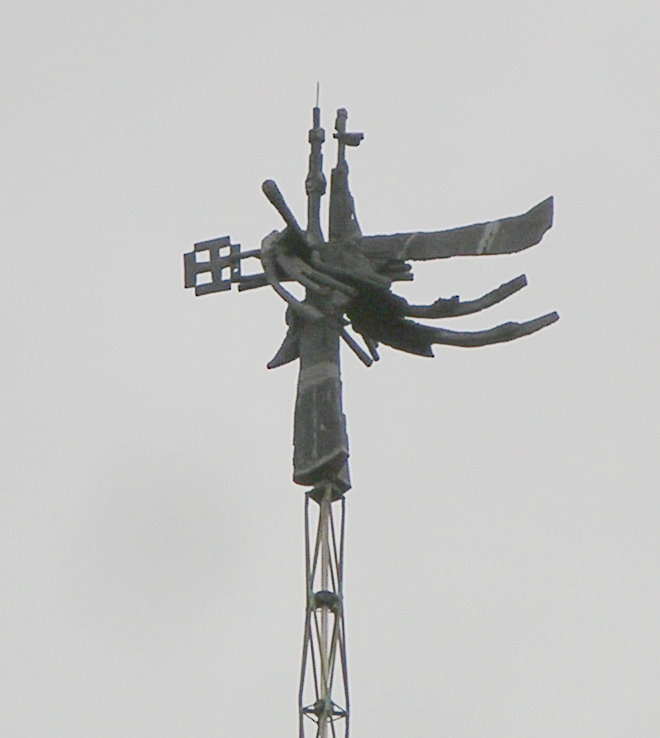
Geoffrey Clarke's winged cross sculpture that crowns the flèche

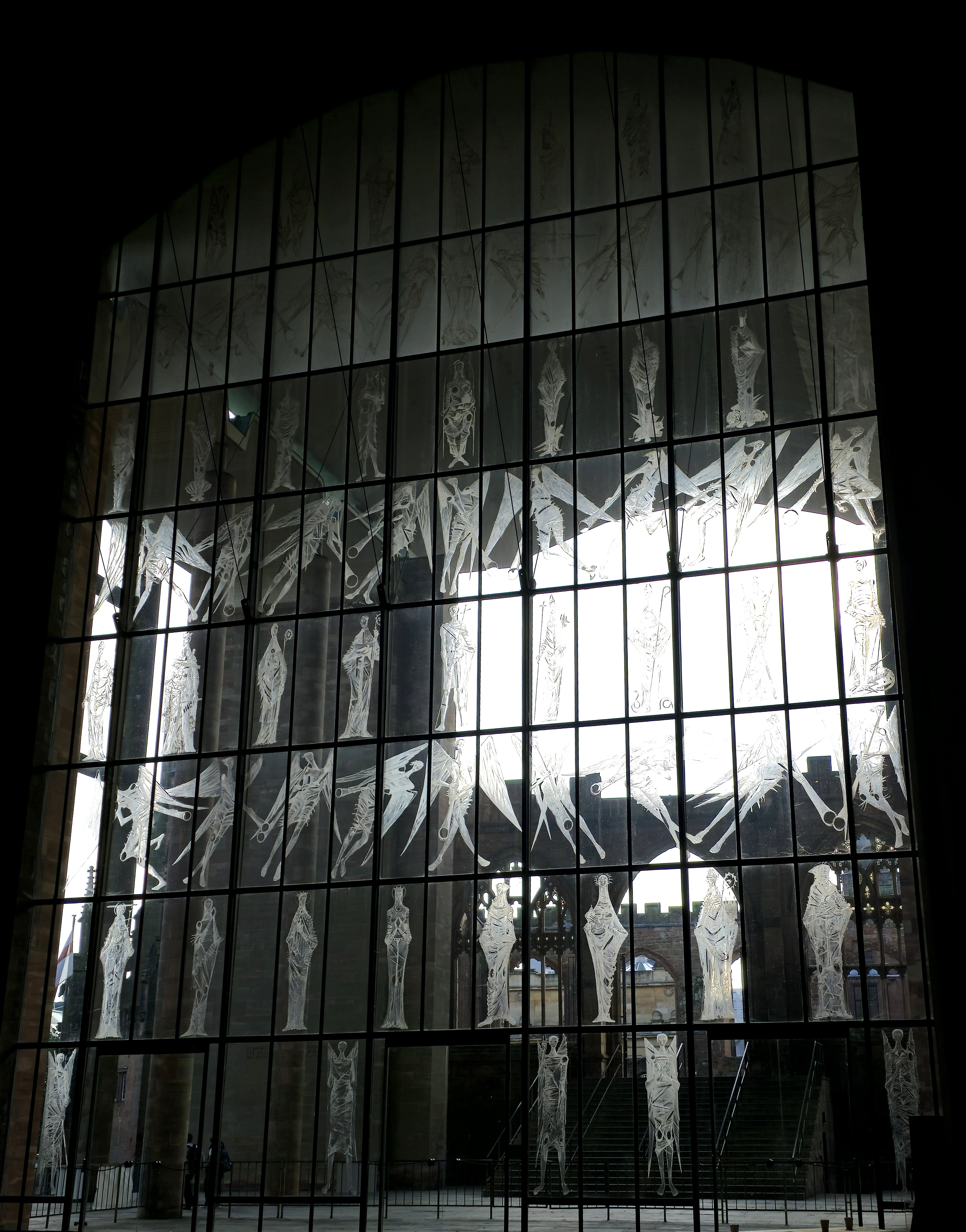
Screen of Saints and Angels by John Hutton

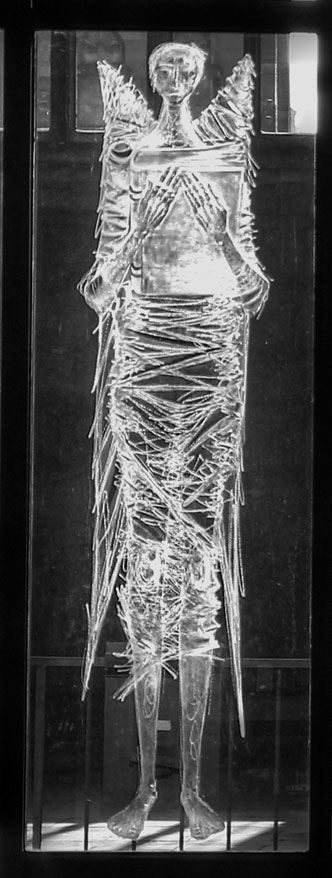
The Angel with the Eternal Gospel by John Hutton, which was smashed in 2020

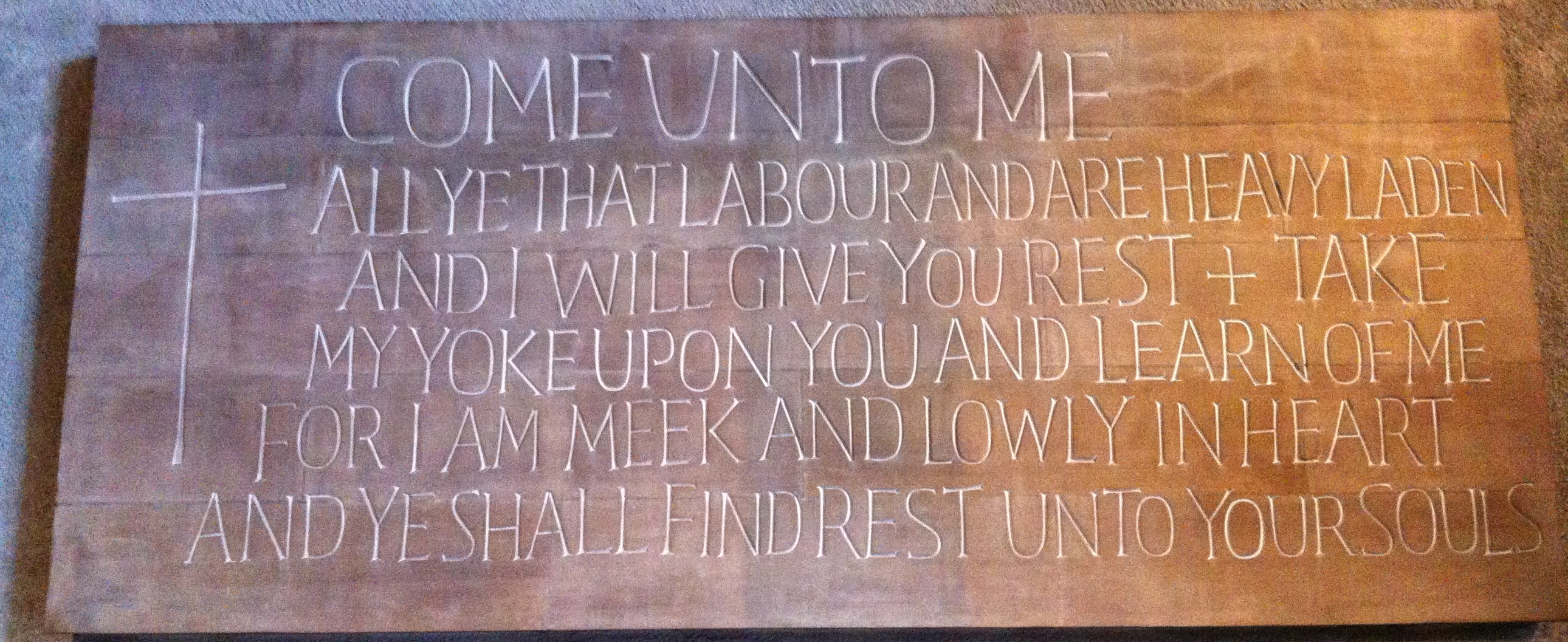
One of ten stone panels, known as The Tablets of the Word, by Ralph Beyer

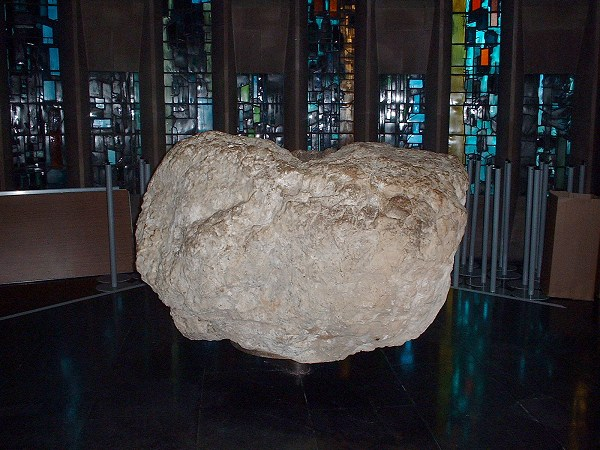
Baptismal font by Ralph Beyer

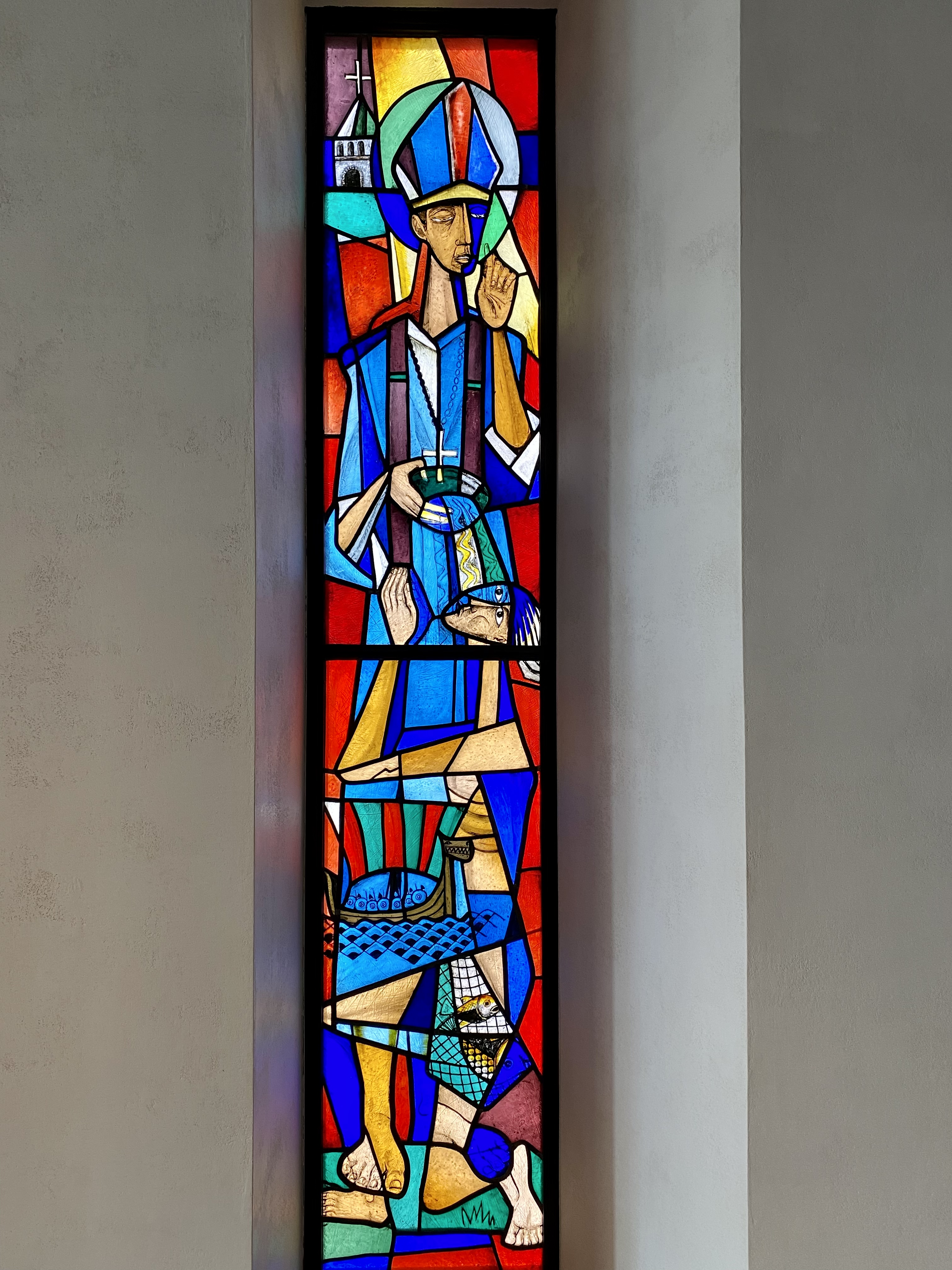
Lady Chapel window by Einar Forseth

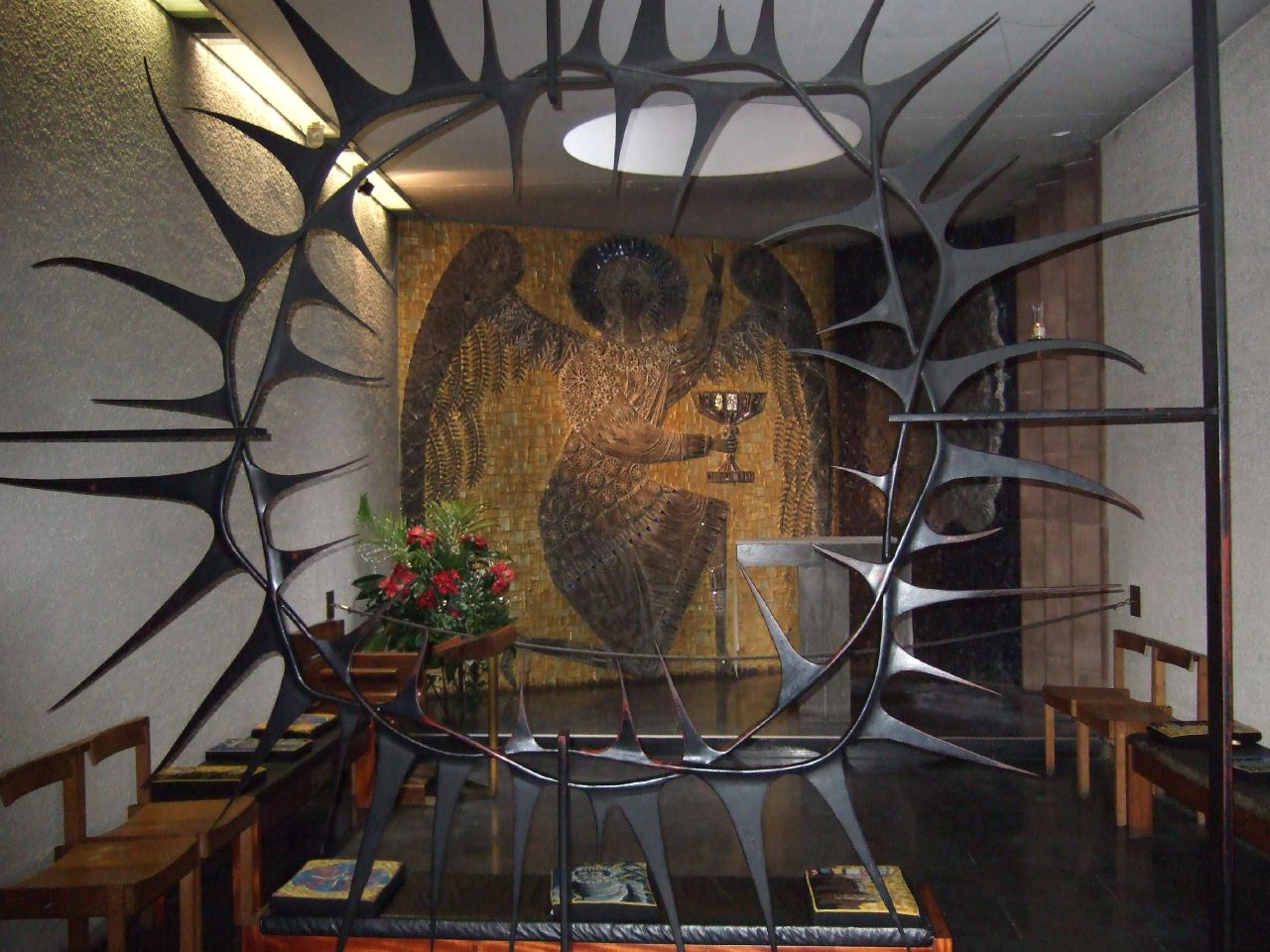
Angel of Agony mosaic by Steven Sykes, seen through Basil Spence's Crown of Thorns screen.

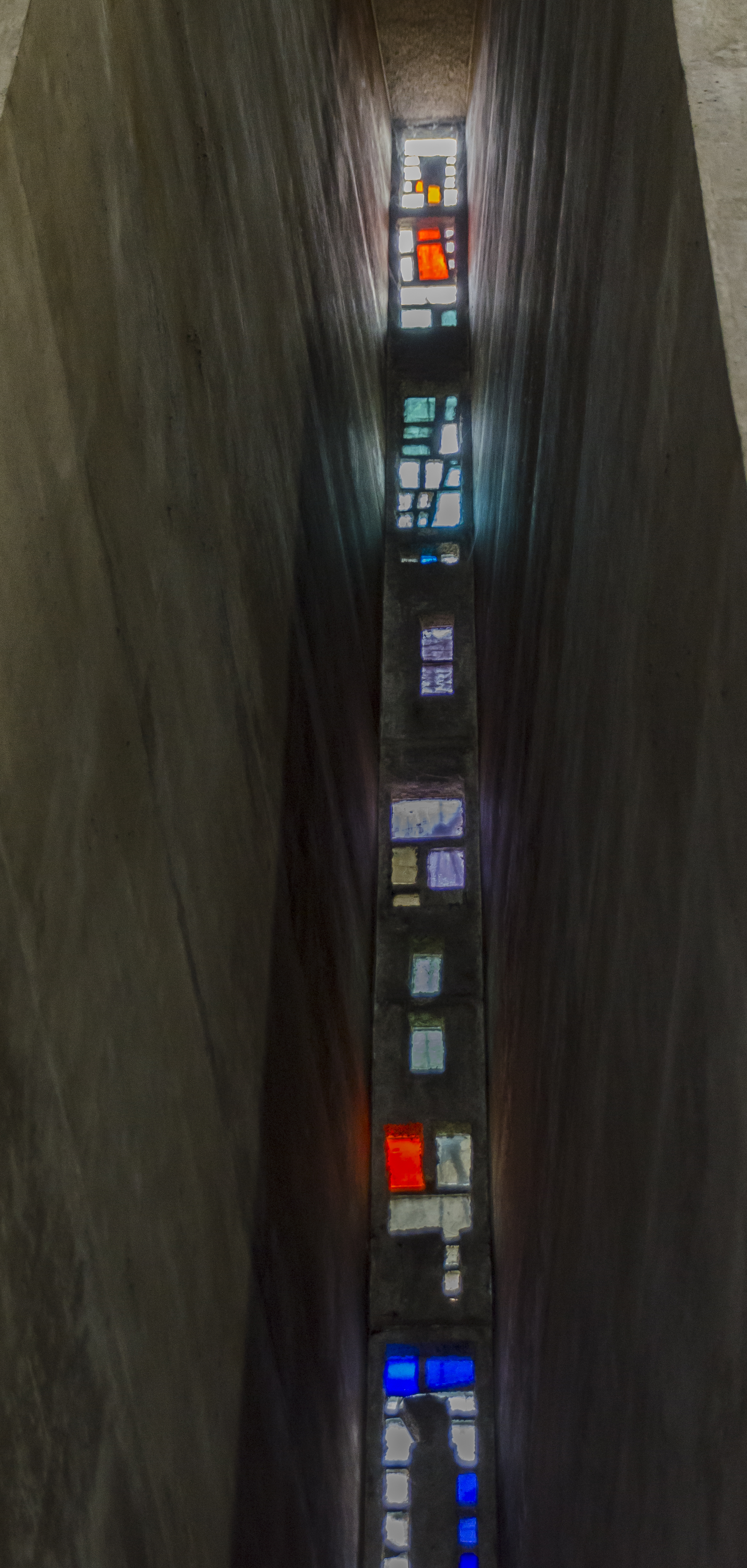
Chapel of Unity window by Margaret Traherne

== Ministry and mission ==
The ministry and mission of the newly consecrated Cathedral has been shaped by the twin priorities of resurrection and reconciliation, established by Provost Howard in the days after the bombing in 1940. The first Provost of the new Cathedral, appointed in 1958 in readiness for the opening in 1962, was HCN (Bill) Williams, who brought the phrase "Christians heal the wounds of history" from his native South Africa. Williams focussed the new Cathedral on witnessing to what God was doing in the world, rather than inside the church, leading a team who were deeply involved in ministry in the city, including the poorer areas, different faith communities, and industry. He also built relationships with Germany and elsewhere in the world through the Community of the Cross of Nails link. The outward focus of the Cathedral and commitment to reconciliation has remained core to its work, and shapes the work of the whole of the Diocese of Coventry.

Successive deans have brought their own theological and missional emphases. Dean John Petty (Provost 1988–2000, Dean 2000) brought a focus on the healing ministry. Dean John Irvine (2001–2012), one of the co-authors of the Alpha Course had a strong emphasis on bible teaching and evangelism. Dean John Witcombe (from 2013) has renewed the early priorities of reconciliation in the world, especially using the arts as a way of stimulating imagination and establishing the role of Canon for Arts and Reconciliation.

The Cathedral's story, embodied in its art and architecture, make it a popular venue for Christian and other events for organisations that want to draw from its values. Since 1962 the Cathedral, encompassing the ruins and new building, has hosted many innovative events, both religious and secular.

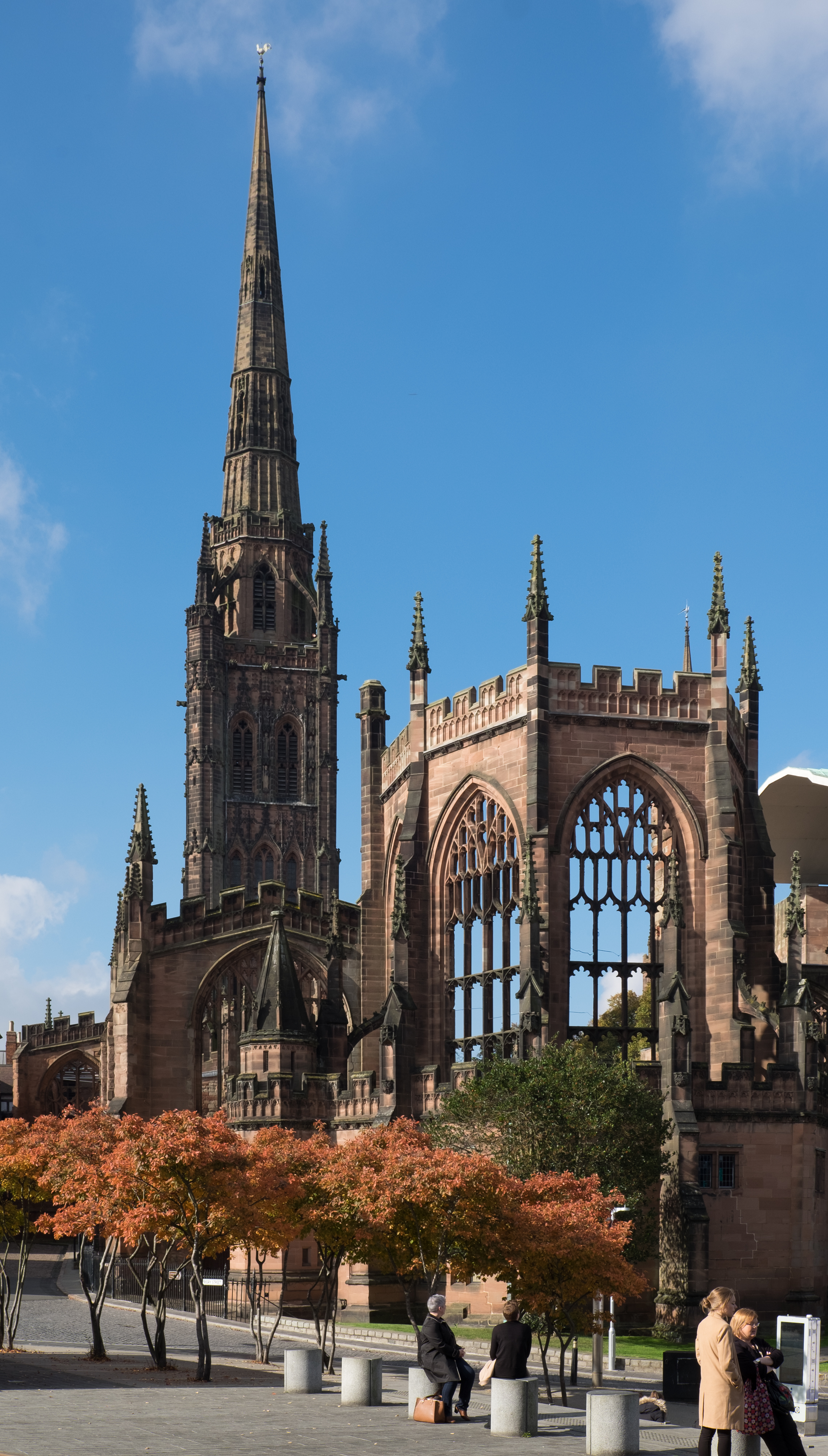
The spire of the original St Michael's Cathedral remains to this day.

The cathedral is also known for innovation in its services. As well as the expected traditional services (on Sundays, eucharist at 10:30 am and choral evensong at 4 pm), there is a 6 pm Sunday service with contemporary music, preaching and prayer ministry. The Cathedral Youth Work runs Goth church and Urban Church outreach congregations for local groups of young people, an equipping and supporting cell group for youth workers within Coventry churches as well as a number of other regular groups. There continues to be a strong influence of reconciliation within the theology (both vertical: reconciling people to God; and horizontal: reconciling individuals and groups). This is present throughout the ministry of the cathedral but is most clearly seen in the International Centre for Reconciliation and the International Network of Communities of the Cross of Nails. The reconciliation work exists locally in reconciling churches and community groups but also internationally (predominantly in the Middle East and central Africa) working with terrorists and dictators as well as local churches, tribes and gangs.

Justin Welby (then a canon of the cathedral) established a special day for bereaved parents in the cathedral after the death of his own daughter. There is now an annual service commemorating the lives of children who have died. A book with the names of dead children is on display in the cathedral and anyone whose child has died under any circumstances can ask for their child's name to be added to the book.

== Symbols of reconciliation ==
The old cathedral grounds are home to a number of symbols of reconciliation to complement the church's mission. At first, however, the cathedral and its symbols represented the wartime destruction and barbarity.

=== The Charred Cross ===
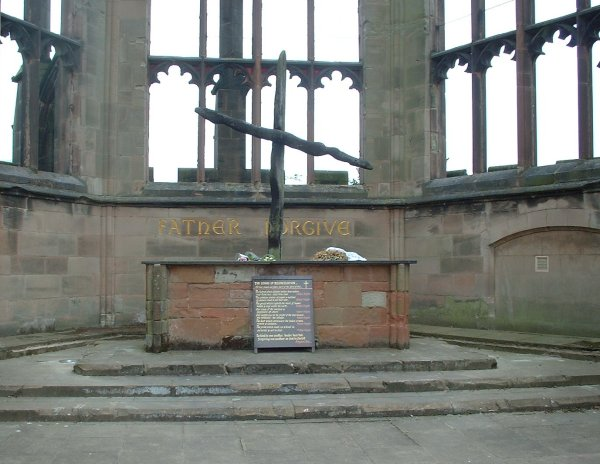
The Charred cross, with the "Father Forgive" inscription behind

The Charred Cross was created after the cathedral was bombed during the Coventry Blitz of the Second World War. The cathedral stonemason, Jock Forbes, saw two wooden beams lying in the shape of a cross and tied them together. A replica of the Charred Cross built in 1964 has replaced the original in the ruins of the old cathedral on an altar of rubble. The original is now kept on the stairs linking the cathedral with St Michael's Hall below.

=== The Cross of Nails ===
The Cross of Nails, also created after the Blitz, was made of three nails from the roof truss of the old cathedral by Provost Richard Howard of Coventry Cathedral at the suggestion of a young friend, the Reverend Arthur Philip Wales. It was later transferred to the new cathedral, where it sits in the centre of the altar cross. It has become a symbol of peace and reconciliation across the world. There are over 260 Cross of Nails Centres all over the world, all of them bearing a cross made of three nails from the ruins, similar to the original one. When there were no more of these nails, a continuing supply has come from a prison in Germany. They are coordinated by the International Centre for Reconciliation.

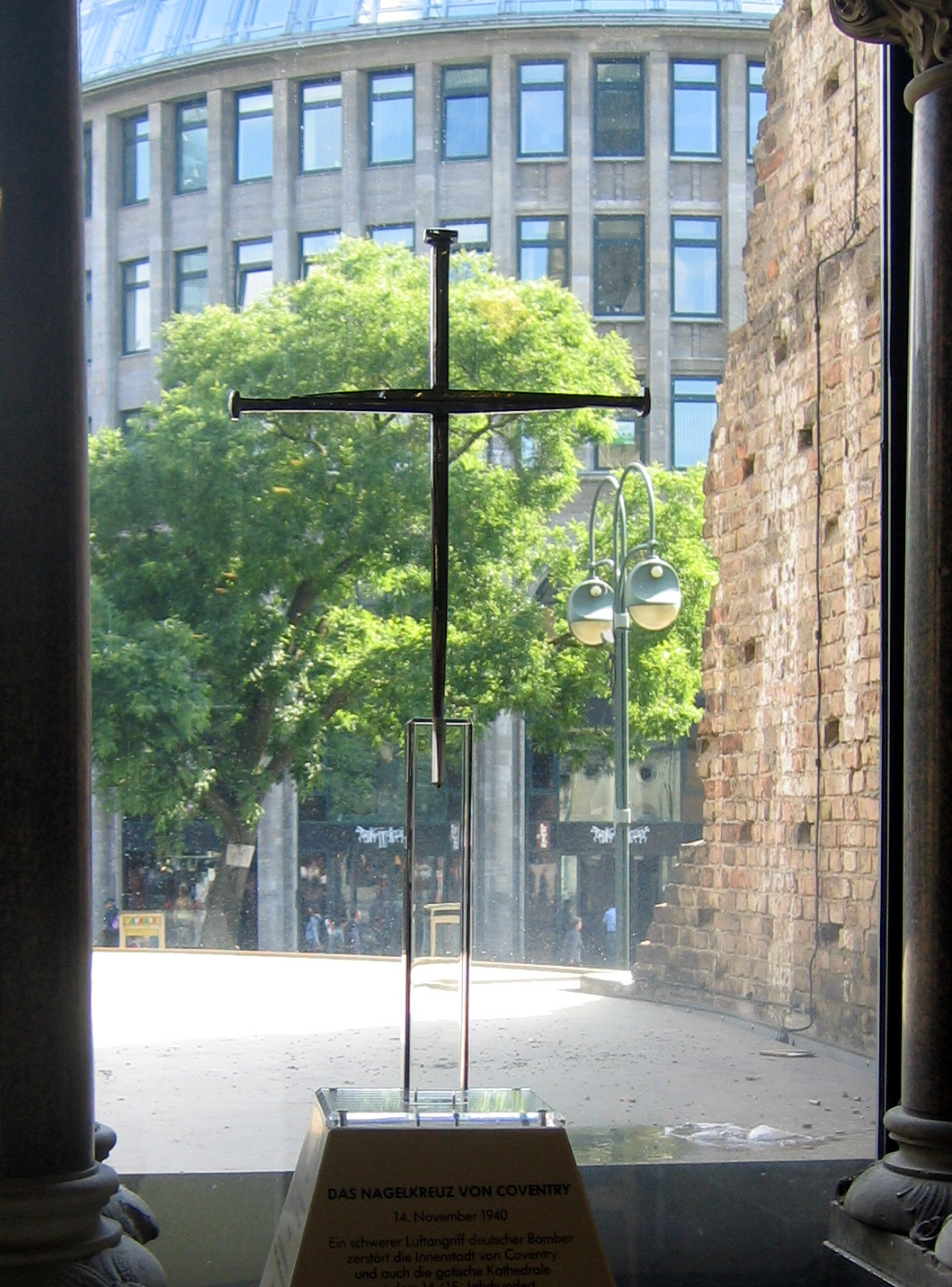
The cross of nails donated to the Kaiser Wilhelm Memorial Church

One of the crosses made of nails from the old cathedral was donated to the Kaiser Wilhelm Memorial Church in Berlin, which was destroyed by Allied bombing and is also kept as a ruin alongside a newer building. A replica of the cross of nails was also presented to the Chapel of Reconciliation (Kapelle der Versöhnung), which forms part of the Berlin Wall Memorial.

A medieval cross of nails has also been carried on board all British warships that have subsequently borne the name HMS Coventry. The cross of nails was on board the Type 42 destroyer Coventry when she was sunk by enemy action in the Falklands War. The cross was salvaged by Royal Navy divers, and presented to Coventry Cathedral by the ship's Captain and colleagues. The cross was subsequently presented first to the next Coventry in 1988 until she was decommissioned in 2002, and then to HMS Diamond, which is affiliated to Coventry, during her commissioning ceremony on 6 May 2011 by Captain David Hart-Dyke, the commanding officer of Coventry when she was sunk.

=== The Stalingrad Madonna ===
A copy of the Stalingrad Madonna by Kurt Reuber that was drawn in 1942 in Stalingrad (now Volgograd) is shown in the cathedrals of all three cities (Berlin, Coventry and Volgograd) as a sign of the reconciliation of the three countries that were once enemies.

=== The statue of Reconciliation ===
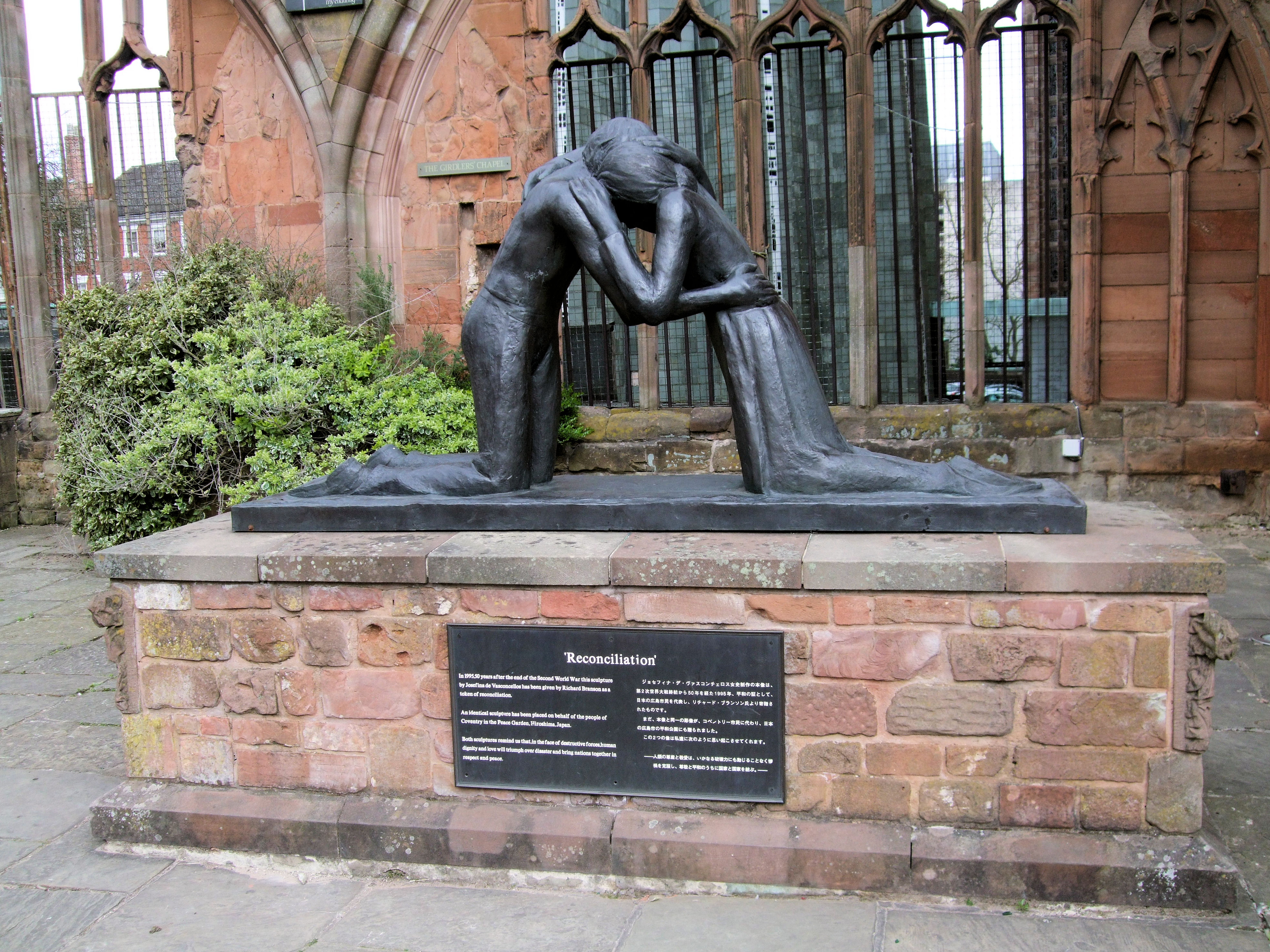
Reconciliation, by Josefina de Vasconcellos

In 1994 the cathedral received a copy of the statue Reconciliation, by Josefina de Vasconcellos. Originally created in 1977 and entitled Reunion, it had been presented to the University of Bradford's Peace Studies department. After repairs and renaming, a bronze cast of the statue was presented to the cathedral in 1995, to mark the 50th anniversary of the end of World War II. Similar copies are held at the Hiroshima Peace Park in Japan, at the Stormont Estate in Northern Ireland, and at the Chapel of Reconciliation in Berlin.

The BBC broadcast a documentary in 1962 entitled Act of Faith, narrated by Leo Genn, detailing the history of Coventry Cathedral, its destruction and rebuilding.

== Music ==
The precentor of the new Coventry Cathedral at the opening service was Joseph Poole. The service was televised and watched by many.

=== Organ ===
The cathedral has a pipe organ by Harrison & Harrison dating from 1962, which is recognised as one of the finest in the UK. A specification of the organ can be found on the National Pipe Organ Register.

=== Directors of music ===
Year	Name
c. 1505	John Gylbard
1733–1749	Thomas Deane
1750–1790	Capel Bond
1790–1818	Mr Woodroffe
1828–1885	Edward Simms
1886–1892	Herbert Brewer
1892–1898	Harry Crane Perrin (afterwards organist of Canterbury Cathedral)
1898	Walter Hoyle (first organist of the cathedral)
1928	Harold Rhodes (formerly organist of St John's Church, Torquay)
1933	Alan Stephenson
1961	David Foster Lepine
1972	Robert Weddle
1977	Ian Little
1984	Paul Leddington Wright (now assistant director of music)
1995	David Poulter (subsequently organist of Chester Cathedral and director of music at Liverpool Cathedral)
1997	Rupert Jeffcoat (subsequently director of music and organist at St John's Cathedral, Brisbane)
2005	Alistair Reid (acting)
2006	Kerry Beaumont
2020	Rachel Mahon

=== Assistant organists / Assistant Director of Music ===
- Allan Hawthorne-Baker 1934–1939
- Michael Burnett
- Robert George Weddle 1964–1972 (then organist)
- J. Richard Lowry 1972–1976
- Ian Little 1976–1977 (then organist)
- Paul Leddington Wright 1977–1984 (then organist)
- Timothy Hone (1984–1987)
- Chris Argent (1987–1990)
- David Poulter 1990–1995 (then director of music)
- Daniel Moult 1995–2002
- Martyn Lane
- Alistair Reid 2004–2011
- Laurence Lyndon-Jones 2011–2013
- Rachel Mahon 2018–2020
- Luke Fitzgerald 2021–2025
- Liam Condon 2025

== Dean and chapter ==
As of June 2024:

- Dean: John Witcombe (since 19 January 2013)
- Andrew Walster (Senior Non-Executive Member)
- Bishop of Warwick
- Canon for Art and Reconciliation: Kate Massey
- Canon for Worship and Welcome: Nitano Muller
- Chris Cliffe
- David Johnston
- Graham Warren
- Martin Williams
- Richard Sapcote
- Robin Thomas

== Burials ==
- Gerard la Pucelle, Bishop of Coventry (1183–1184)
- Huyshe Yeatman-Biggs, Bishop of Coventry (1918–1922): a bronze effigy of him, commissioned by Hamo Thornycroft, was the only artefact to survive the bombing of the old Coventry Cathedral in 1940

== Gallery ==
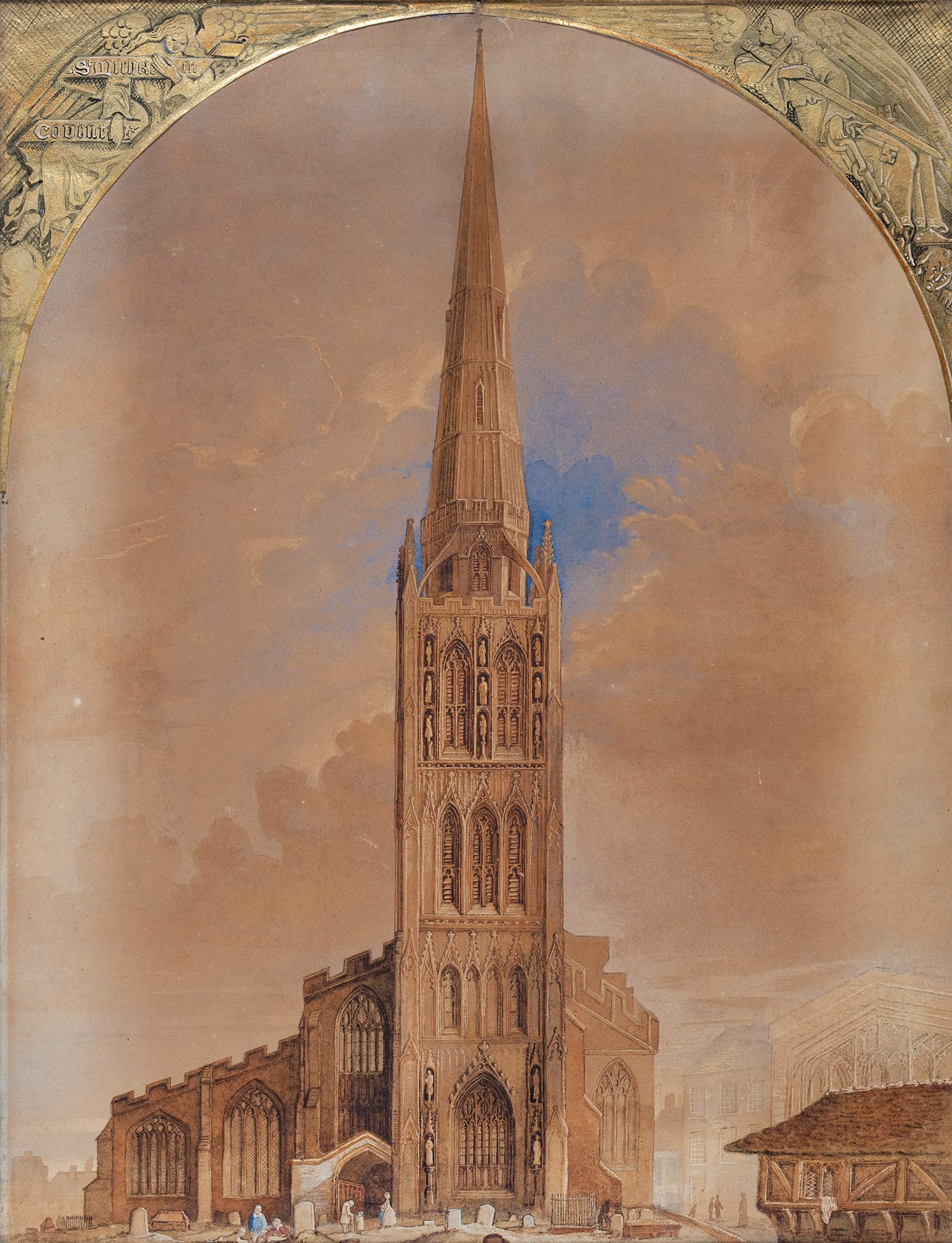
St Michael's in Coventry (Anon, c. 1850)

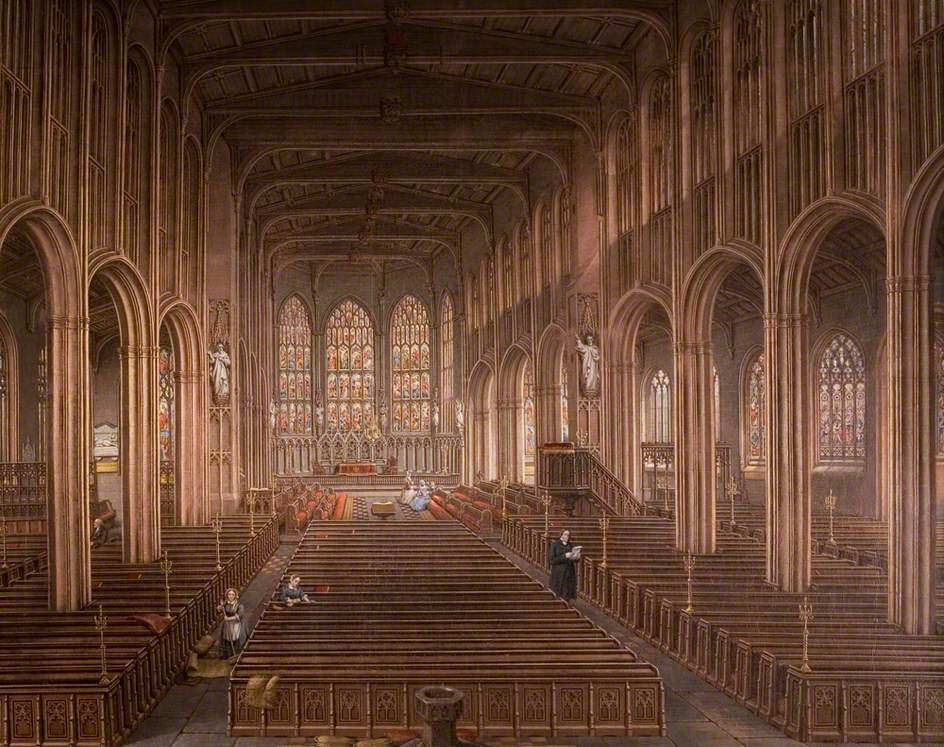
Interior of St Michael's Church by David Gee, 1862

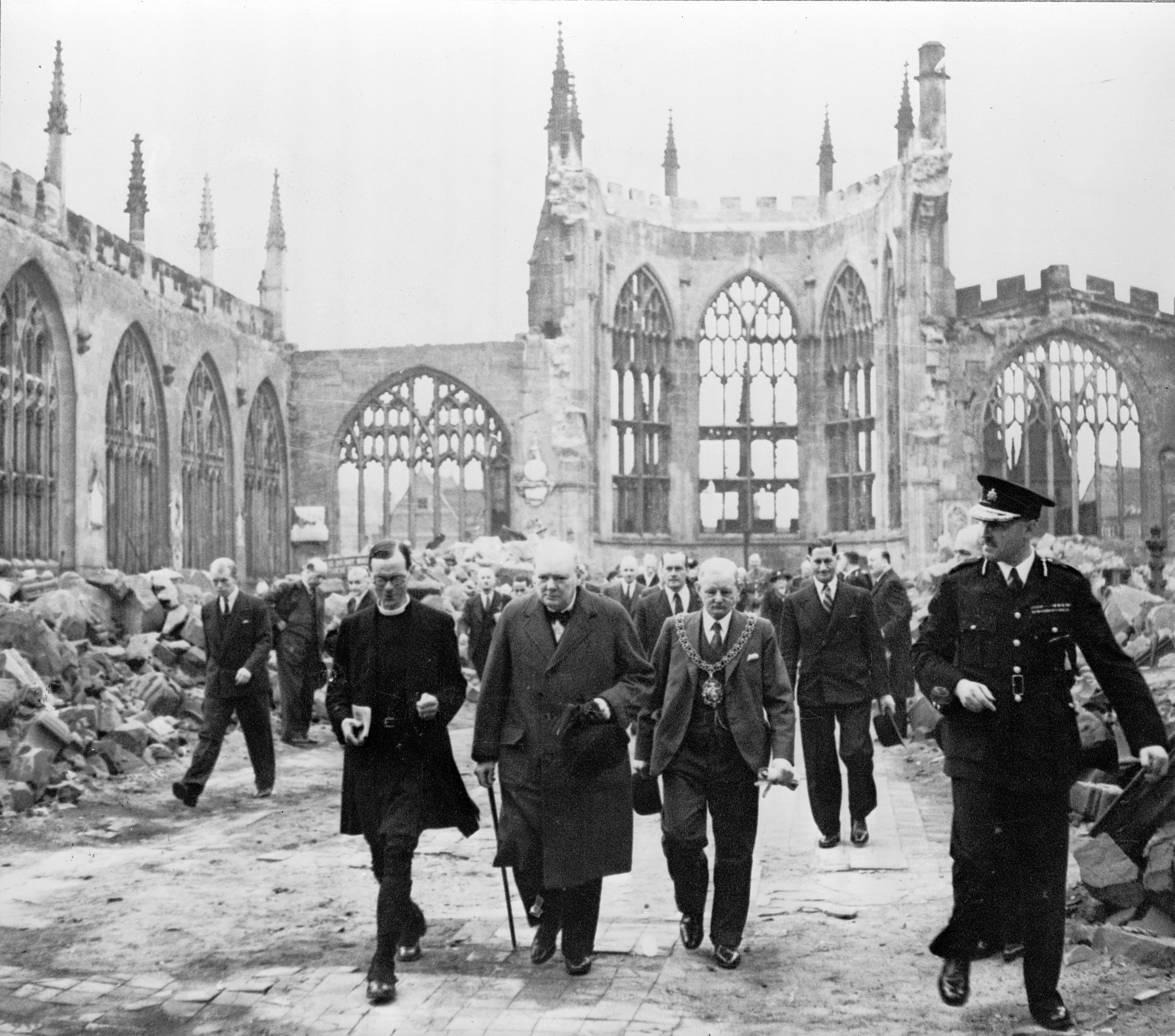
Winston Churchill visiting the ruins of the old cathedral in 1941

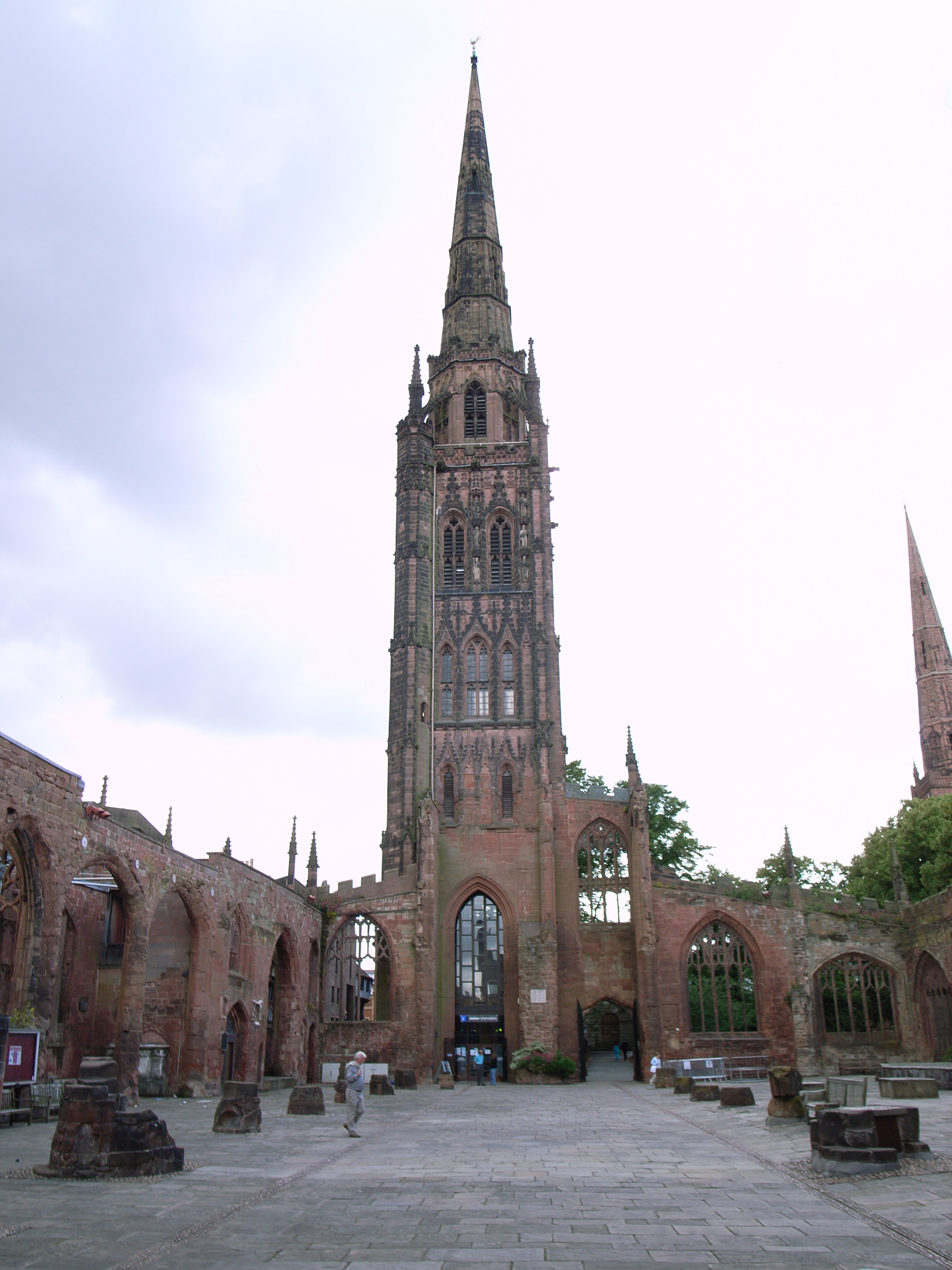
The surviving tower and steeple, which functions as a working bell tower

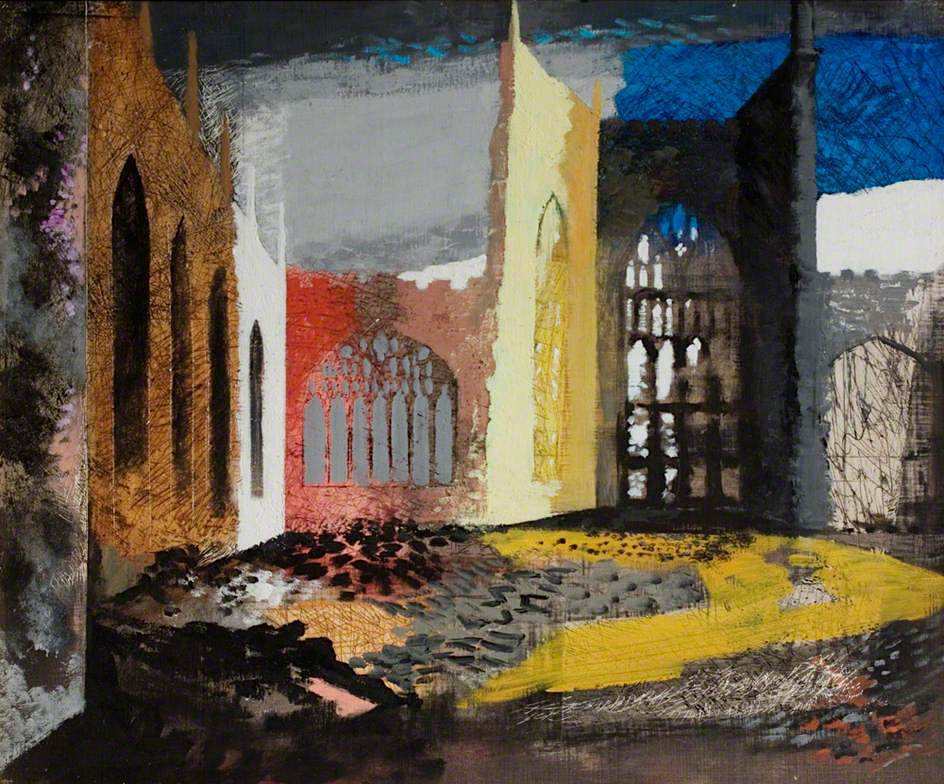
The ruined cathedral, as depicted by John Piper in 1940.

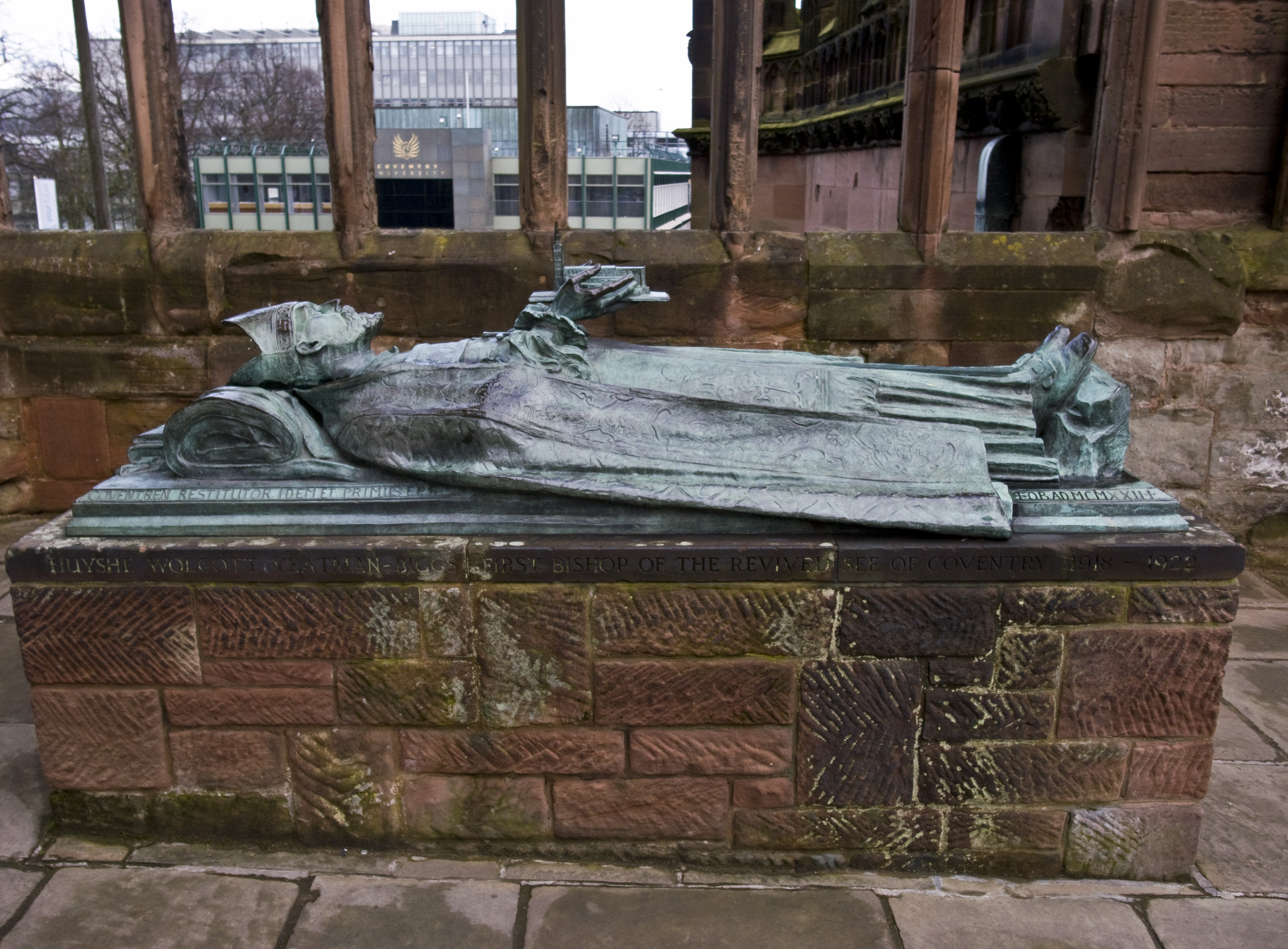
Effigy and tomb of Huyshe Yeatman-Biggs, first Bishop of Coventry

== See also ==
- Bishop of Coventry Chronological list of Bishops from 1918 to present.
- Dean of Coventry Chronological list of Provosts and Deans
- List of cathedrals in the United Kingdom
- List of tallest structures built before the 20th century
- Grade I listed buildings in Coventry
- Kaiser Wilhelm Memorial Church, its German counterpart in Berlin
- Coventry Chronicle
