= Ronald Edward Perrin =

British cathedral organist (1931–1997)

Ronald Edward Perrin (13 April 1931 – 5 September 1997) was a British cathedral organist.

== Career ==
Born in London, Perrin's initial education was at Edmonton County Grammar School. He won an organ scholarship to Christ Church, Oxford, from where he graduated with an honours degree in music. Following National Service, he secured his first appointment as Assistant Organist at Leeds Parish Church. He then moved to York Minster, becoming assistant to Dr Francis Jackson. In April 1966, Dr Philip Marshall, Organist and Master of the Choristers at Ripon Cathedral, moved to Lincoln Cathedral, and Perrin was appointed as his successor.

For a number of years in the 1960s, he also taught music at Holy Trinity School in Ripon.

Perrin held the post at Ripon Cathedral for almost thirty years until his retirement in 1994. He was a prolific composer and is also credited with a significant widening of the repertoire at Ripon. He died from cancer in September 1997, and is buried at Ripon.

Perrin shared several Organ recitals with Carlo Curley, the America virtuoso, playing to large audiences, and they had in common a desire to popularise the organ recital. He was a Licentiate of the Royal Academy of Music and a Fellow of Trinity College, London.

== Compositions ==
His compositions include Magnificat and Nunc Dimittis in A (Trebles), Magnificat and Nunc Dimittis in A flat, and a Te Deum in C. He also wrote three major settings of the Anglican Communion Service: St Wilfrid's Mass, Riponensis and the Missa Sancti Petri.

His anthem Angel voices ever singing is the best known of his many works in this genre. Perrin also supplied a number of anglican chants for inclusion in the Ripon Cathedral Chant Book.

== Appointments ==
- Assistant Organist Leeds Parish Church ???? - 1957
- Assistant Organist York Minster 1957 - 1966
- Organist and Master of the Choristers, Ripon Cathedral 1966 - 1994

Cultural offices
Preceded by Philip Marshall	Organist and Master of the Choristers of Ripon Cathedral; 1966-1994	Succeeded by Kerry Beaumont
