= Paul Spicer (musician) =

English composer, conductor, and organist

Paul Spicer (born 6 June 1952) is an English composer, conductor, and organist. He taught choral conducting at the Royal College of Music and conducted the RCM Chamber Choir between 1995 and 2008. Until his retirement in July 2022 he also taught at the Royal Birmingham Conservatoire and conducted their chamber choir which records for Somm Records. He also teaches at Oxford and Durham universities. Since 2004 he has been the conductor of the Petersfield Festival. He was Senior Producer for BBC Radio 3 for the Midlands Region based in Birmingham between 1984 and 1990 after which he moved to be artistic director of the Lichfield Festival. He also produced for various record companies over many years. He founded the Finzi Singers in 1984 making many recordings for Chandos Records. He conducts the Birmingham Bach Choir and the Whitehall Choir in London. His compositions include two oratorios for Easter and for Advent with libretti by the Dr Tom Wright and a choral symphony 'Unfinished Remembering' (2014) to a libretto by Euan Tait commemorating the outbreak of World War 1. He runs a series of choral courses under the banner of The English Choral Experience based mainly at Abbey Dore in Herefordshire.

Spicer is a champion of early 20th century British composers. He founded the Finzi Singers and is a trustee of the Finzi Trust and Chairman of the Finzi Friends. He is vice-president of the Herbert Howells Society, author of a biography of Howells and contributor to the volume of Howells studies published by Boydell & Brewer looking at the composer's music in depth. Spicer's chapter considers Howells' use of the melisma and his approach to word setting. He also contributed the article on Howells in the Dictionary of National Biography. His major biography of Sir George Dyson was published by Boydell & Brewer in 2014. He is an advisor to the Sir George Dyson Trust. He is now working on a biography of Sir Arthur Bliss to be published by Jonathan Hope in 2017. He has written practical guides to all of James MacMillan's and Benjamin Britten's choral music and his volume of English Pastoral Partsongs was published by Oxford University Press.

Paul Spicer is a Fellow of the Royal Society of Arts, an Honorary Research Fellow of Birmingham University, Honorary Fellow of University College, Durham University (Castle), and an Honorary Fellow of the Royal Birmingham Conservatoire.

== Biography ==
Spicer was born in Bowdon, Greater Manchester in 1952, and became a chorister at New College, Oxford. After Oakham School, Rutland he then attended the Royal College of Music in London, where he studied with the composer Herbert Howells and the organist Richard Popplewell. He taught music at Uppingham School and Ellesmere College from 1974 until 1984, and was then Senior Producer for BBC Radio 3 in the Midlands until 1990.

From 1990 to 2001, Spicer was artistic director of The Lichfield Festival. He introduced a number of innovations, including staging opera at the festival, and having a Composer-in-Residence, among whom were William Mathias and Robert Saxton.

From 1995 to 2008 he taught at the Royal College of Music, latterly as a professor of choral conducting, and has since taught at choral conducting at the Royal Birmingham Conservatoire and Oxford and Durham Universities. He has recorded many CDs of choral music, including over 15 with the Finzi Singers for Chandos Records and 6 to date with the Royal Birmingham Conservatoire Chamber Choir together with numerous discs with the Birmingham Bach Choir and Whitehall Choir. He takes choral workshops and choral courses all over the world.

== Compositions ==
Spicer has written chamber music and works for organ and piano, and is best known for his choral compositions. The Deciduous Cross (2003) is a choral setting of poems by the Welsh poet and priest R. S. Thomas. Spicer's Easter Oratorio (2000) was written in collaboration with the Bishop of Durham, Dr Tom Wright, as was his Advent Oratorio (2009).

To commemorate the centenary of the outbreak of the 1914-18 War the Birmingham Bach Choir commissioned the poet Euan Tait and Paul Spicer to write a major choral and orchestral work for performance. Entitled Unfinished Remembering it debuted on 14 September 2014 at Birmingham's Symphony Hall. The four-movement choral symphony was described as "excellent, deeply-felt". The concert also featured the premiere of A Shared Singing by Spicer, with words by Euan Tait.

As part of the centenary celebrations for Birmingham Bach Choir in 2019, he composed Steal Away, a piece inspired by African American spirituals.

== Writings ==
Spicer's biography of his former teacher, Herbert Howells – Border Lines, was published in 1998 by Seren Books. His biography of the composer George Dyson was published by Boydell & Brewer in 2014.
