= Birmingham Bach Choir =

British chamber choir

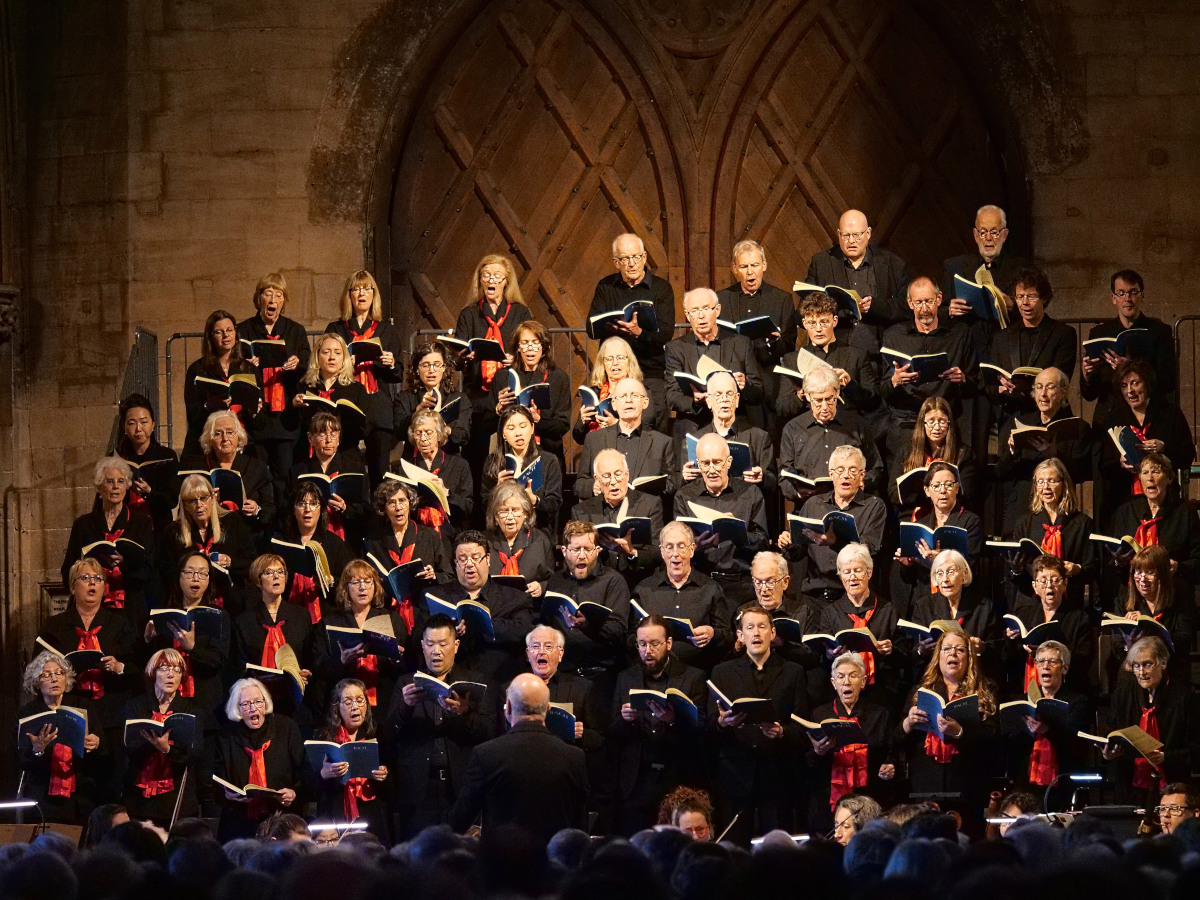
- Birmingham Bach Choir in concert at Lichfield Cathedral, Staffordshire (5 April 2025)

Background information
- Origin: Birmingham, England
- Genres: Choral
- Years active: 1919–present
- Website: birmingham.bachchoir.com

The Birmingham Bach Choir is a large chamber choir based in Birmingham, United Kingdom. Established in 1919, it is one of the city's oldest musical groups, predating both the City of Birmingham Symphony Chorus and the City of Birmingham Choir.

== History ==
The origins of the Birmingham Bach Choir date back to October 1919 and the formation of the Birmingham Bach Society which was established by Bernard Jackson, a Bach enthusiast and musicologist.

In 1929 the choir was re-established as The Birmingham Bach Club and affiliated to The Bach Cantata Club in London. Dr. Allen Blackhall, organist at St. Mary’s, Warwick and subsequently Principal of the Birmingham School of Music, was appointed conductor.

The society was returned to the name Birmingham Bach Society in 1947.

Richard Butt was appointed as Conductor and Director of Music in 1966. His tenure included major changes to organization and programming. The Choir undertook various commissions of new works, including pieces by David Lord, Rory Boyle and Paul Spicer (Darling of the World). Choral performances were also accompanied by recitals by such leading figures as Yehudi Menuhin, Paul Tortelier and George Malcolm.

In 1989, the Choir was invited to give a performance of Bach’s Mass in B minor at the Church of St. Thomas in Leipzig (the church where Bach served as cantor for 27 years), an event described as "one of the great crowning achievements in the life of the Choir."

== Paul Spicer: 1992-present ==
Paul Spicer took over as Conductor in 1992 after being invited to apply by Richard Butt the year before.

Subsequently, the choir changed its name to the Birmingham Bach Choir and extended its repertoire into the 20th century and contemporary music, notably works by Benjamin Britten, Edward Elgar, Gerald Finzi, Herbert Howells and John Joubert.

The choir has continued to premiere new choral works, including Spicer's The Deciduous Cross, a work based on five poems by RS Thomas commissioned for Paul's 10th anniversary as conductor; Easter Oratorio which was recorded by the Choir with Lichfield Cathedral Choristers and Special Choir and the English Symphony Orchestra in 2005; and Unfinished Remembering, at Birmingham Symphony Hall in 2014, to commemorate the centenary of the start of the Great War. The performance of Unfinished Remembering was described by the Birmingham Post as "one of the most important concerts" in the choir's history.

Other premieres include Universal Nature by John Joubert (commissioned by Nicholas Fisher for the choir and first performed in 1994); My Heart Danceth by Eleanor Alberga (commissioned by the choir as part of a nationwide series of concerts celebrating the eightieth birthday of John Joubert, composer and patron of the Choir, and debuted in 2007); and Steal Away, a spiritual-based piece written by Paul Spicer as part of the choir's 2019 centenary.

In 2019, Roderick Williams was announced as a Patron as part of the choir's year-long centenary celebrations, which included an autumn Gala Concert at Lichfield Cathedral.

== Repertoire ==
Although the main focus of the choir is the Baroque period, they perform music spanning over 500 years including 20th and 21st century works.

Discussing the Choir's repertoire, Paul Spicer told MusicWeb International's John Quinn: "Whenever we do Bach we feel we’re coming home, so it is a Bach choir, very much with a purpose. But we have a very broad-based repertoire indeed and we go back a long way before Bach and come right up to the present day. And, of course, with my particular interest in twentieth century British music we’ve done a huge amount of that over these years."

=== Commissions and First Performances ===
The choir has premiered numerous new choral pieces by distinguished composers, many of them commissioned. These include Wofully Araide commissioned from David Lord (1970); Best Glorious Man (1991) and The Rochester Triptych (1994) by John Joubert (1991); Love and Life by Adrian Partington (1999); How God Answers the Soul by Aaron Jay Kernis (1996); as well as numerous pieces by Paul Spicer including A Shared Singing and Unfinished Remembering (2014), Festival (2015) and The Darling of the World (1986).

== Critical reception ==
The choir have been described as one of the UK's leading large chamber choirs

They have been praised for their "wonderful breadth of tone" and "thought-provoking" performances, boasting "an impressive team of soloists."

== Discography ==
- Easter Oratorio (2005)- described by MusicWeb International as "a substantial work" with the choir "singing with good tone and dynamic range, clarity and conviction."
