= Derby School of Music =

Location
- 75 Saint Albans Road; Derby, Derbyshire, DE22 3JL; England
- 52.913002°N 1.503103°W

Information
- Type: Music School
- Established: 1885
- Founder: Arthur Francis Smith
- Specialist: Music
- Head: Steve Churchill
- Staff: 12
- Gender: Mixed
- Enrolment: 300
- Website: https://www.derbyschoolofmusic.com

Derby School of Music is an independent private music school originally established in 1885, based in Derby, England. It offers private tuition on musical instruments and music theory, and provides grade examinations with all the major music exam boards in the UK including; ABRSM, London College of Music, Trinity College of Music, Rockschool, Victoria College of Music. Pupils can take these qualifications on to advanced study at conservatoires or universities.

== History ==
The Derby School of Music was founded in 1885 by Arthur Francis Smith. The music school originally was located on Friargate in Derby, before moving to its current location in 2011. The music school operates on a private basis and has always taught most of the mainstream instruments including piano, violin, singing, guitar etc. Arthur Francis Smith was keen to showcase the students abilities and would regularly put on public performances at local venues in Derby in order for students to gain valuable performance experience, this tradition has carried on at the music school to the present day.

Derby school of music has also produced many of the countries leading organists.

Derby school of music also produced many music education books in the late 19th century including their own series of technical work books. The Derby school of music series was compiled by the school's head teacher Arthur Francis Smith.

== Notable students ==
- Ronald Binge
- David Anthony Cooper
- Alfred William Wilcock
- Edward Francis Reginald Woolley
- Clement Charlton Palmer

== Head Teachers ==
- Arthur Francis Smith (Founder and Head Teacher 1885–1912)
- Edward Chadfield (Head Teacher 1912–1914)
- Edgar Pettman (Head Teacher 1914–1921)
- Arthur Griffin Claypole (Head Teacher 1921–1929)
- M Palmer (Head Teacher 1929–1930)
- Hubert Henry Norsworthy (Head Teacher 1930–1938)
- George Handel Heath-Gracie (Head Teacher 1938–1944)
- Edward Francis Reginald Woolley (Head Teacher 1944–1954)
- John Callis Brydson (Head Teacher 1954–1973)
- Steve Churchill (Head Teacher 2012 – present)

== Modern era ==
The music school now operates solely as a pre-college music school and provides private music tuition for pupils looking to move on to study music at university. Along with Chetham's School of Music, Purcell School, Wells Cathedral School and Yehudi Menuhin School, Derby School of Music is recognised as being a feeder school for the UK's conservatoires.

Derby school of music are regular judges at the TeenStar, Open Mic UK and Live and Unsigned competitions.
