= Hanlin =

Hanlin may refer to:

- Hanlin, Burma
- Hanlin Academy, an institution of imperial China
- Tom Hanlin, a Scottish fiction writer
