= Arthur Francis Smith =

British organist and composer

Arthur Francis Smith (1849 – 1914) was a British organist and composer, and founder of the Derby School of Music.

== Career ==
Smith was a pupil of Edward Chadfield, and graduated BMus (1883) at Queens' College, Cambridge. He served as organist of St George's Church, Ticknall (1869–1872), then organist at St Werburgh's Church, Derby (1872–1912).

Smith worked as a local choral society conductor, and editor of the monthly Journal of the Incorporated Society of Musicians. He was an honorary member and local representative and examiner for the Royal Academy of Music, and the Royal College of Music.

Smith was a founder of the Derby School of Music (1885), and Head Teacher from 1885–1912. He wrote a series of technical work books published by Weekes & Co. in 1896.

== Compositions ==
Smith composed the setting of Psalm 103 'Praise The Lord' for voices and orchestra, and much church music including Te Deum in G (1894).
