= Edward Chadfield =

- Born: 1 August 1825; Derby, England
- Died: 1914 (aged 88–89)
- Occupations: Music educator; organist; composer

Edward Chadfield (1825–1914) was a prominent music educator, organist and composer.

== Background ==
Born in Derby on 1 August 1825, he went to France to study at the Conservatoire de Paris. He was a pupil of Froude Fritche and Henry Smart, and studied with Henri Rosellen and Jan Korbach.

Chadfield returned to the UK where he became father to Edward Joseph Chadfield (1862–1956), (a child prodigy on the organ).

In 1861 he was appointed head organist at St Werburgh's Church, Derby (1861-1872). Whilst in this role Chadfield became an educator to many of the up-and-coming organists in the local area.

In 1882 Chadfield was elected as the general secretary of the Incorporated Society of Musicians a role which he held until 1912. He then served as head teacher at Derby School of Music from 1912 to 1914. Chadfield took the role as a favour for his long time friend and former pupil Arthur Francis Smith who was the founder of the music school but at the time was experiencing ill health.

== Compositions ==
Chadfield was a prominent composer of traditional plain song pieces for the English Church. He was also a major contributor to the substantial compilation of English Airs 'A Collection of National English Airs'.

Chadfield also wrote the famous hymn 'wings of song' which was published in the 'Church Hymns with Tunes' which was edited by Arthur Sullivan in Easter 1874.
