= Tom Hanlin =

Scottish writer

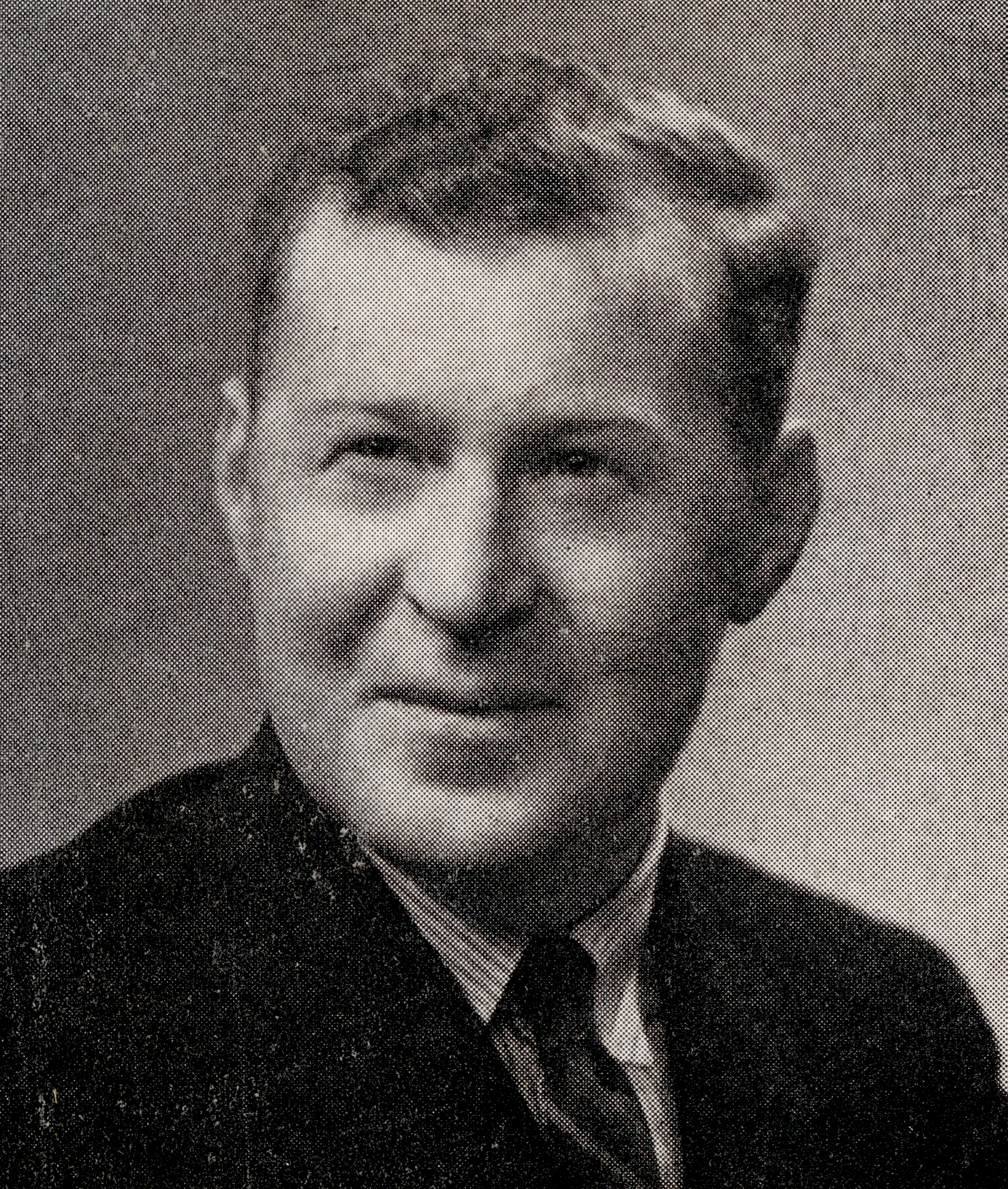
- Hanlin c. 1946
- Born: 28 August 1907; Armadale, West Lothian
- Died: 7 April 1953 (aged 45)
- Occupations: Miner, writer
- Writing career
- Language: English
- Notable work: Once in Every Lifetime

Tom Hanlin (28 August 1907 – 7 April 1953) was a Scottish fiction writer, known for writing a number of novels which were influential and sold widely.

== Life ==
Hanlin was born in Armadale, West Lothian on 28 August 1907. At the age of 14 he left school and worked on a farm for a year, then got a job at a mine where he worked for the next twenty years. While working as a miner he began to study at a journalism school in Glasgow. After a workplace accident in 1945, he spent three months in the Royal Infirmary, and he began to write stories and sell them, thus realising his childhood dream.

Hanlin died at home on 7 April 1953, after developing heart and breathing problems.

== Writing ==
During his lifetime, Hanlin wrote over thirty short stories, several novels and essays, and eight radio plays, two of which were broadcast. Once in Every Lifetime, published in 1945, was his most popular novel, selling 250,000 copies in the United Kingdom in the first three weeks of publication. It also won the £500 first prize in the Big Ben Books Competition, and was translated into more than a dozen languages.

Once in Every Lifetime was serialised in Woman's Home Companion, and a radio version was later broadcast on BBC Radio. Norman Collins, writing in the Observer, wrote that "his novel is an idyll of young love that somehow became sour and unlovely amid the grim landscape of the pitheads. It is brief, moving in places, almost unbearably so, and often beautiful. In short Mr. Hanlin is a remarkable fellow." John Steinbeck also spoke enthusiastically of the author, declaring the book "excellent."

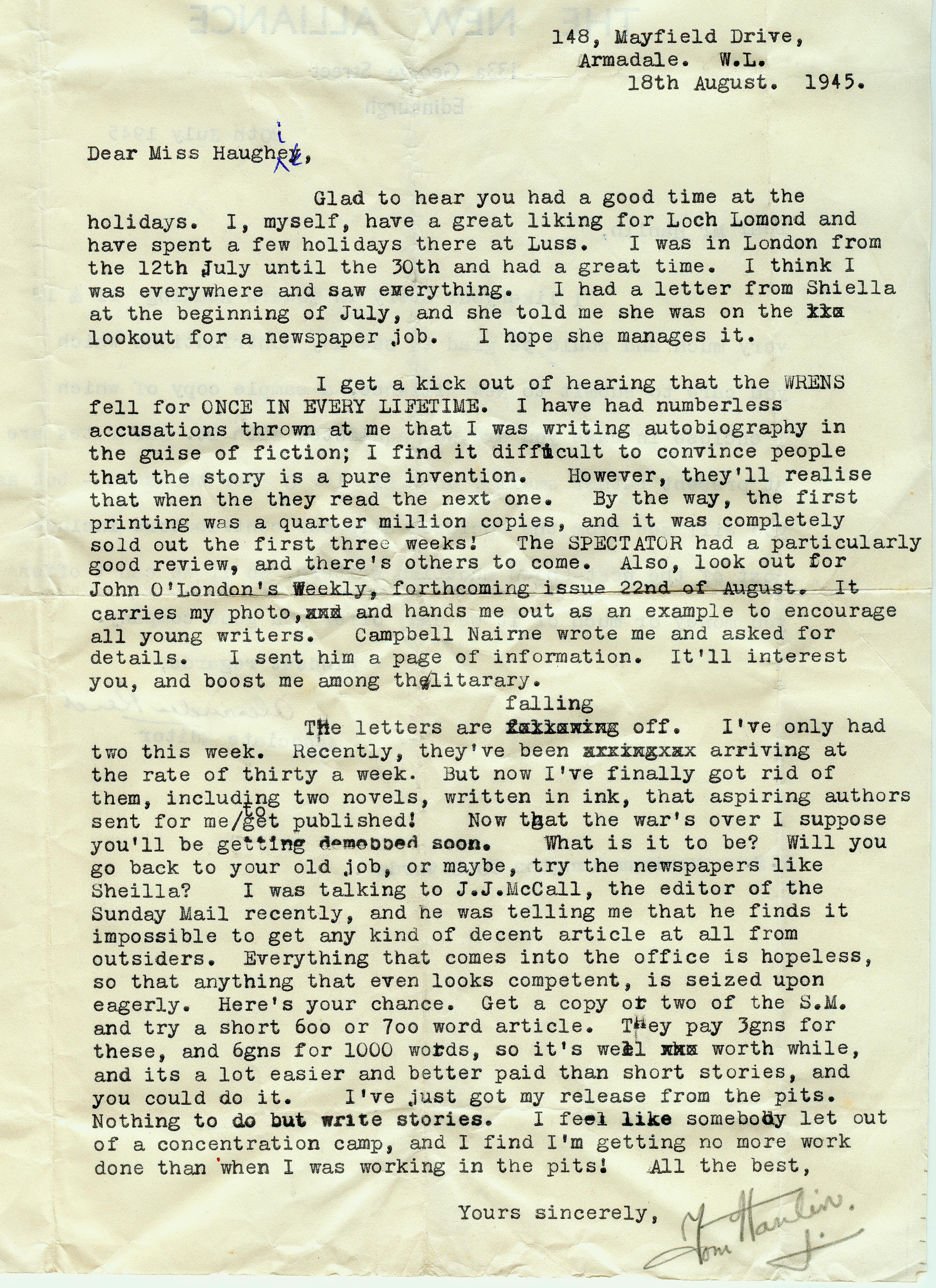
A letter found in a Hanlin book once owned by a Miss Haughie.

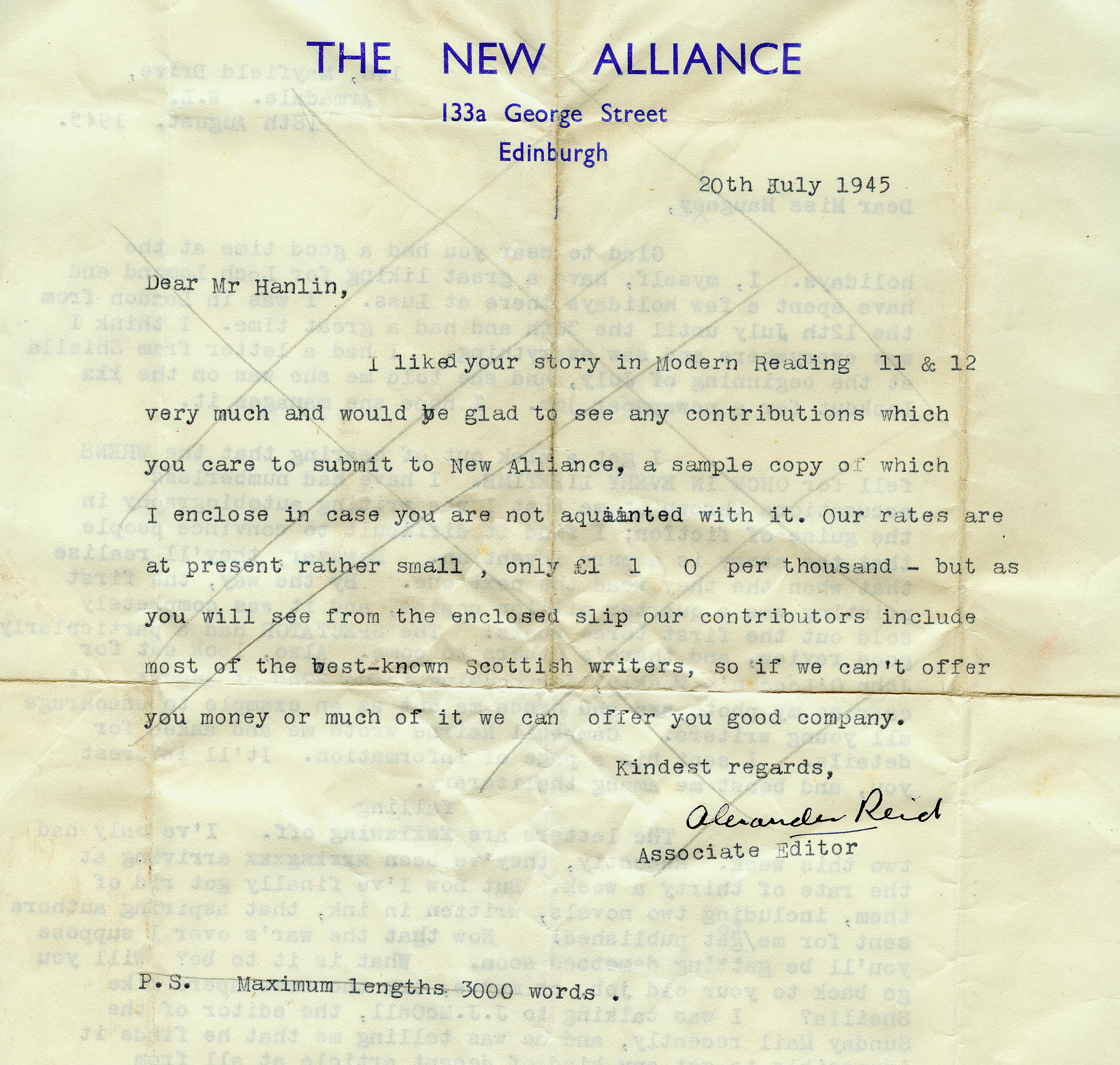
Tom Hanlin used the reverse of this letter to send the above letter to Miss Haughie.

In his writing Hanlin draws on the themes of love and religion, but always in the context of the gritty realism and poverty of life in a small mining town. The Scotsman review of The Miracle at Cardenrigg notes "Tom Hanlin uses a miraculously averted pit disaster to bring into sharp focus the life of a Scottish mining community and to present his Catholic and predominantly tragic view of earthly life."

=== Short stories and articles ===
- "Temper the Wind", Virginia Quarterly, Autumn 1945
- "Bright and Cheerful is the Day", Virginia Quarterly, Autumn 1945
- "My Shadow on the Side of the Tunnel", Lilliput, May 1945, Vol. 16
- "And Always will be", Lilliput, May 1945, Vol. 16
- "Strange the Way", Lilliput, May 1945, Vol. 16
- "The Fair" Lilliput, May 1945, Vol. 16
- "The Road isn't Always Broad", Story Magazine, 1946, Jul–Aug., Vol. 29
- "Over a Lifetime you may", Good Housekeeping, 1947
- "One More Chance, a story", Modern Reading 16, edited by Reginald Moore, Phoenix House Limited
- "The Novel is Doomed"
- "Tension-Snap-Relief"
- "Sunday in the Village"

=== Novels ===
- Once in Every Lifetime, Nicholson & Watson, 1945 (serialised in Woman's Home Companion, Nov 1945)
- Yesterday will Return, Nicholson & Watson, 1946 (republished as Mima, Bantam Books, New York 1952)
- The Miracle at Cardenrigg, 1949
- Nor is the Night Starless

=== Plays ===
- One More Chance
- Beneath the Surface

== Awards ==
- Arthur Markham Memorial Prize awarded by Sheffield University, for the essay Sunday in the Village in April 1944
- Big Ben Book Competition, first prize of £500, for Once in Every Lifetime
