= St Werburgh's Church, Derby =

Coordinates: 52.9232°N 1.4812°W

- STW Derby
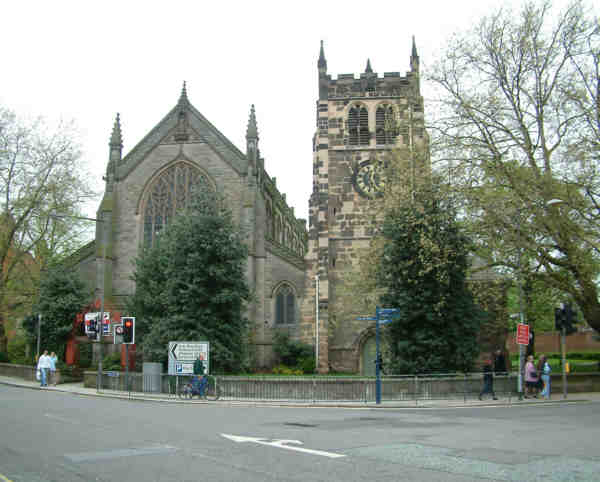
- St Werburgh's Church, Derby, showing the body of the church on the left, and the conserved tower on the right

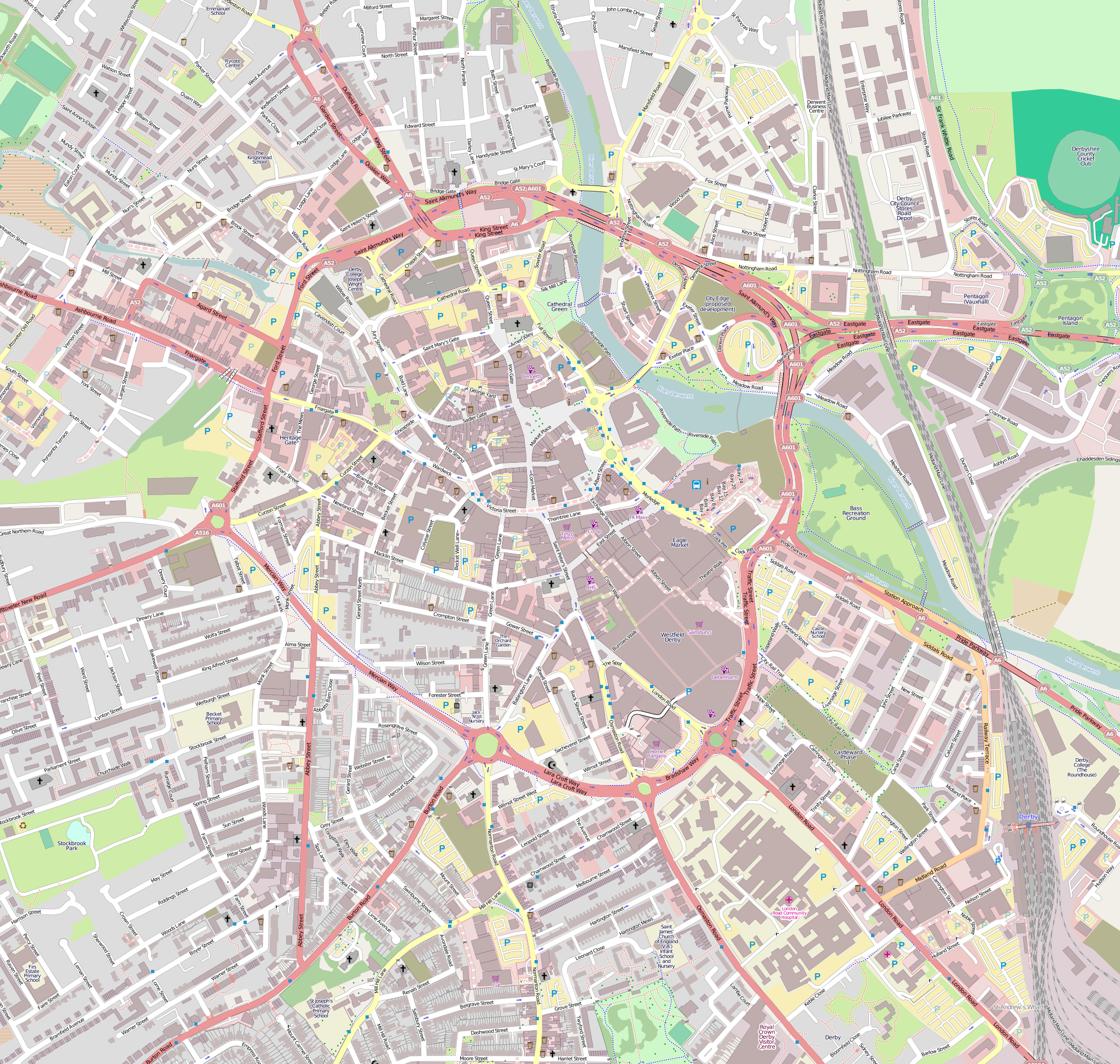
- Location in Derby
- OS grid reference: SK 34979 36323
- Location: Derby, Derbyshire
- Address: St Werburgh's Church, Friar Gate, Derby, Derbyshire, DE1 1BU
- Country: England
- Denomination: Anglican
- Churchmanship: Charismatic Evangelical
- Website: https://www.stwderby.org

History
- Status: re-opened
- Dedication: Saint Werburgh

Architecture
- Functional status: Active
- Architect: Sir Arthur Blomfield (rebuilding)
- Architectural type: Church
- Style: Gothic Survival, Gothic Revival
- Completed: 1894
- Closed: 1990

Specifications
- Capacity: 240

Administration
- Province: Province of Canterbury
- Diocese: Diocese of Derby
- Archdeaconry: Archdeacon of Derby City and South Derbyshire
- Deanery: Derby City
- Benefice: N/A (Bishop's Mission Order)
- Parish: St Alkmund and St Werburgh

Clergy
- Pastor: Rev. Canon Phil Mann

Listed Building – Grade II*
- Official name: Church of St Werburgh
- Designated: 20 June 1952
- Reference no.: 1287685

St Werburgh's Church is an Anglican church on Friar Gate in the city of Derby, England. It is recorded in the National Heritage List for England as a Grade II* listed building. In this church, Samuel Johnson (Dr Johnson) married Elizabeth Porter in 1735.

The church has two sections, which, although connected, have no internal access between them: these are the tower/chapel and the main church. The 17th-century tower and old chancel are in the care of the Churches Conservation Trust (CCT); the key is kept at the nearby Derby Museum and Art Gallery.

The main church was closed as a place of worship in 1984 but reopened in September 2017 as part of the Holy Trinity Brompton Church network. The church meets for worship every Sunday in the main church at 10.30am and 6.30pm every Sunday and is of a contemporary music style.

== History ==
It is of medieval origin, but the oldest surviving part of the church is the tower, which was rebuilt between 1601 and 1608. The chancel was built in 1699. The remainder of the church was rebuilt in 1893–94 in stone from Coxbench quarry, the architect being Sir Arthur Blomfield. The style of this rebuilding is Gothic Revival in the manner of the 15th century.

The church closed in 1984 and the parish joined with St Alkmund's. Memorials from the main body of the church were moved into the chancel and some of the windows, by Kempe and Herbert William Bryans, were moved to All Saints' Church, Turnditch. The church was declared redundant in 1990, and the body of the church was converted to commercial use. The building has been an indoor market and Chinese restaurant but was closed for seven years. On 17 September 2017, St Werburgh's reopened as a church.

The tower and chancel were vested in the Churches Conservation Trust in 1989. The tower was refurbished in 2004, and contains a chapel known as the "Johnson Chapel".

Samuel Johnson married Elizabeth Porter (née Jervis) on 9 July 1735. Elizabeth (or "Tetty") was a well-to-do widow. At the time he was 25, she 46, and neither family was enthusiastic about the match. The marriage lasted until Elizabeth's death in 1752.

== Architecture ==
The tower is in Gothic Survival style. The chancel of 1690 has been converted into a side chapel. It contains many of its original fittings and furniture, including an elaborate wrought iron font cover made by Robert Bakewell. The reredos contains panels inscribed with the Ten Commandments, the Lord's Prayer and the Apostles' Creed. Over the reredos is the royal coat of arms of Queen Anne. The stained glass is from the studio of Charles Eamer Kempe, and there is a monument dated 1832 by Francis Leggatt Chantrey.

The chancel has a wall-mounted war memorial by Arthur George Walker. It is a cast-bronze figure of Christ with arms outstretched surmounting a plaque. The inscription reads "Remember 1914–1918 / (Names) / Blessed are the Peacemakers". A total of 47 men are listed.

== Clock ==
In 1938, the 200-year-old clock failed and a new clock was commissioned from John Smith of Derby.

== Organ ==
The church had an organ as early as 1750. A new organ by John Gray was opened on 3 February 1841. It was replaced by a new instrument by Walker and Sons of London which was opened on 14 December 1872. After several restorations and enlargements (including Henry Willis & Sons in 1905), it became a four-manual instrument with 47 speaking stops. A specification of the organ can be found on the National Pipe Organ Register. William Hartley Ashton was organist and choir master in early 1910s and 1920s. In 1989 the organ was sold to All Saints, Newton Heath, Greater Manchester but never installed.

=== Organists ===
- F Roome ca. 1766 – ca. 1812
- Edward William Gover ca. 1841
- Henry W. James ca. 1846 – ca. 1851
- Edward Chadfield 1861–72
- Arthur Francis Smith 1872–1911
- Norman Hibbert 1912–41 (formerly organist of St Luke's Church, Derby)
- Leslie Taylor 1941–43 (formerly organist of St Alkmund's Church, Derby)
- H. Stanley Mayes 1943—????
- Stanley Mayes was succeeded by Dr Arthur Pope (Head of Music at Bemrose Grammar School), and later by David Johnson, also Head of Music at Bemrose.
- Christopher Martin Thomas 1975–81; left to become Director of Music at Waltham Abbey, Essex

== See also ==
- List of churches preserved by the Churches Conservation Trust in the English Midlands
- Grade II* listed buildings in Derby
- Listed buildings in Derby (Arboretum Ward)
