= Hubert Henry Norsworthy =

Hubert Henry Norsworthy (1885 - 18 August 1961) was an organist and composer based in England.

== Life ==
He was born in Haverigg, Millom in Cumberland in 1885, the son of John Henry Norsworthy and Annie Dawson.

During the First World War he served in the Royal Engineers.

He was Head Teacher at Derby School of Music from 1930-1938

He married Paulina Dickinson in 1920.

He died in Lancaster on 18 August 1961 and was buried in Skerton Municipal Cemetery.

== Appointments ==
- Organist of Hexham Abbey 1918
- Organist of St. Luke's Church, Derby 1933 - 1942

== Compositions ==
His compositions include:

- Nuptial Song for Organ 1905
- Reverie in D flat for Organ 1907
- Gavotte for Piano 1907
- Meditation for Organ 1908
- Chanson romantique for organ 1908
- A Farewell Song. 1912
- Priel 1913
