= Once in Every Lifetime =

Novel by writer Tom Hanlin first published in 1945

First edition (publ. Nicholson & Watson)

Once in Every Lifetime is a novel by the Scottish writer Tom Hanlin first published in 1945.

This debut novel by a then unknown Scottish miner sold 250,000 copies in the United Kingdom in the first three weeks of publication. It also won the £500 first prize in the Big Ben Books Competition, and was translated into more than a dozen languages.

The novel was serialized in Woman's Home Companion, and a radio version was later broadcast on BBC Radio. Norman Collins, writing in the Observer, wrote that "his novel is an idyll of young love that somehow became sour and unlovely amid the grim landscape of the pitheads. It is brief, moving in places, almost unbearably so, and often beautiful. In short Mr. Hanlin is a remarkable fellow." John Steinbeck also spoke enthusiastically of the author, declaring the book "excellent."
