= Lionel Dakers =

English cathedral organist

Lionel Frederick Dakers CBE (24 February 1924 – 10 March 2003) was an English cathedral organist who served in Ripon Cathedral and Exeter Cathedral.

== Background ==
Dakers was born on 24 February 1924 in Rochester, Kent. He studied organ under Harold Aubie Bennett at Rochester Cathedral and Edward Bairstow at York Minster. He graduated Mus.Bac. at Durham University in 1951.

He was a Special Commissioner for the Royal School of Church Music (1958–1972); Director of the Royal School of Church Music (1972–1990); President of the Incorporated Association of Organists (1972–1975); Secretary of the Cathedral Organists' Association (1972–1988); and President of the Royal College of Organists (1976–1978). He was appointed CBE in 1983.

== Family life ==
Dakers married Elisabeth Williams (d. 1997) in 1952. They had four daughters. He died in Salisbury, Wiltshire, on 10 March 2003.

== Career ==
Assistant organist of:

- St. George's Chapel, Windsor Castle (1950–1954)

Organist of:

- All Saints' Church, Frindsbury, Rochester (1939–1942)
- Cathedral of Our Lady of Fatima, Cairo (1945–1947)
- Finchley Parish Church (1948–1950)
- Ripon Cathedral (1954–1957)
- Exeter Cathedral (1957–1972)

== Publications ==
- 1970: Church Music at the Crossroads
- 1976: A Handbook of Parish Music; Mowbray
- 1978: Making Church Music Work
- 1980: Music and the Alternative Service Book (as editor)
- 1980: The Chorister's Companion (as editor)
- 1980: The Psalms – Their Use and Performance (as editor)
- 1982: The Church Musician as Conductor
- 1982: A Handbook of Parish Music; revised; Mowbray
- 1984: Church Music in a Changing World
- 1985: Choosing – and Using – Hymns
- 1991: Parish Music (3rd ed. of the Handbook); Canterbury Press
- 1995: Places Where They Sing – Memoirs of a Church Musician; Canterbury Press

Cultural offices
Preceded by Charles Harry Moody	Organist and Master of the Choristers of Ripon Cathedral; 1954–1957	Succeeded by Philip Marshall
Preceded by Reginald Moore	Organist and Master of the Choristers of Exeter Cathedral; 1957–1972	Succeeded by Lucian Nethsingha
