= St Luke's Church, Derby =

St. Luke's Church, Derby
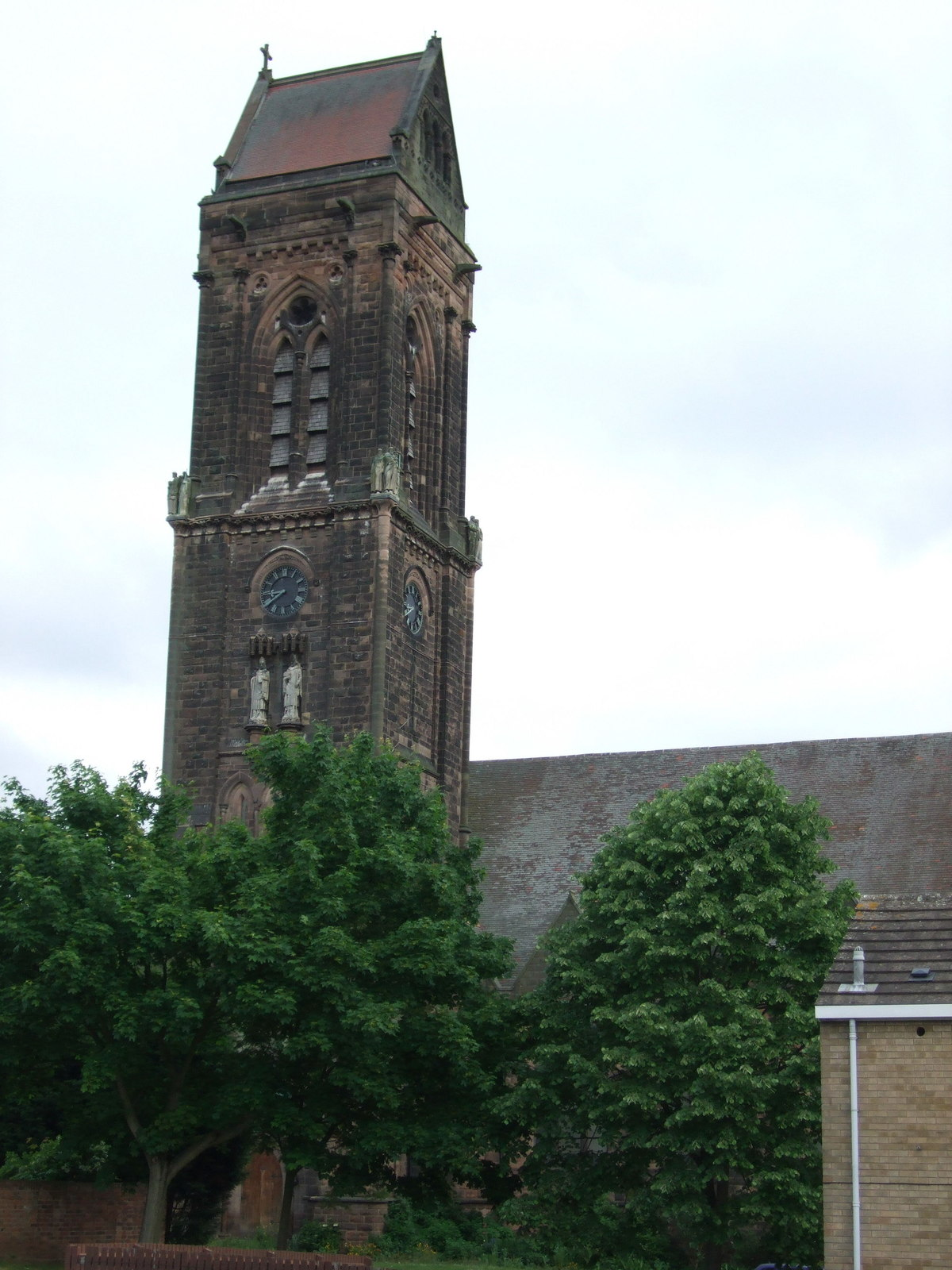
- St. Luke's Church, Derby
- OS grid reference: SK 34321 35626
- Location: Derby
- Country: England
- Denomination: Church of England
- Churchmanship: Anglo-Catholic

Architecture
- Heritage designation: Grade II* listed
- Architect: Henry Isaac Stevens
- Groundbreaking: 1868
- Completed: 1871

Specifications
- Length: 122 feet (37 m)
- Width: 46 feet (14 m)

Administration
- Diocese: Diocese of Derby

Clergy
- Bishop: Rt Revd Paul Thomas SSC (AEO)

St. Luke's Church is a Grade II* listed parish church on Parliament Street in Derby in the Church of England.

== History ==
The church was erected between 1868 and 1871 based on designs by the architects Henry Isaac Stevens and Frederick Josias Robinson. The church was consecrated on Saturday 24 June 1871 by the Bishop of Lichfield George Selwyn. In the 1880s, a mission church of St George was opened in the Firs Estate.

St Luke's is a traditional Anglo-Catholic church. It is a member of Forward in Faith, an Anglo-Catholic organisation that opposes the ordination of women and liberal attitudes towards homosexuality. It is under the alternative episcopal oversight of the Bishop of Oswestry (currently Paul Thomas). On 1 April 2017, St Luke's joined with another Anglo-Catholic Derby church, St Bartholomew's in Allenton, to form a united benefice of St Batholomew and St Luke. The Church is also under the patronage of The Society.

== Organ ==
A temporary organ was obtained when the church was first opened, but resources were found to purchase a new three-manual organ from Abbott of Leeds and this was opened on 18 October 1881. A specification of the current organ can be found on the National Pipe Organ Register.

=== Organists ===
- Henry Houseley (1870–1882)
- George Bramley (1882–1884)
- Arthur Rawlinson Wood (1884–1901)
- Norman Hibbert (1901–1912) (afterwards organist of St Werburgh's Church, Derby)
- Arthur Griffin Claypole (1912–1914)
- A W Wilford (1915–1918)
- Arthur Griffin Claypole (1918–1921)
- A.H. Fithyan (1921–1924)
- Alban Claughton (1924–1925)
- Fred Morley (1925–1927) (afterwards organist of All Saints' Church, Ripley, Derbyshire)
- Horace Barker (1927–1933)
- Hubert Henry Norsworthy (1933–1942)
- Colin William Mellor (1963–77)
