= Charles Harry Moody =

English composer and organist

Dr Charles Harry Moody CBE FRCO
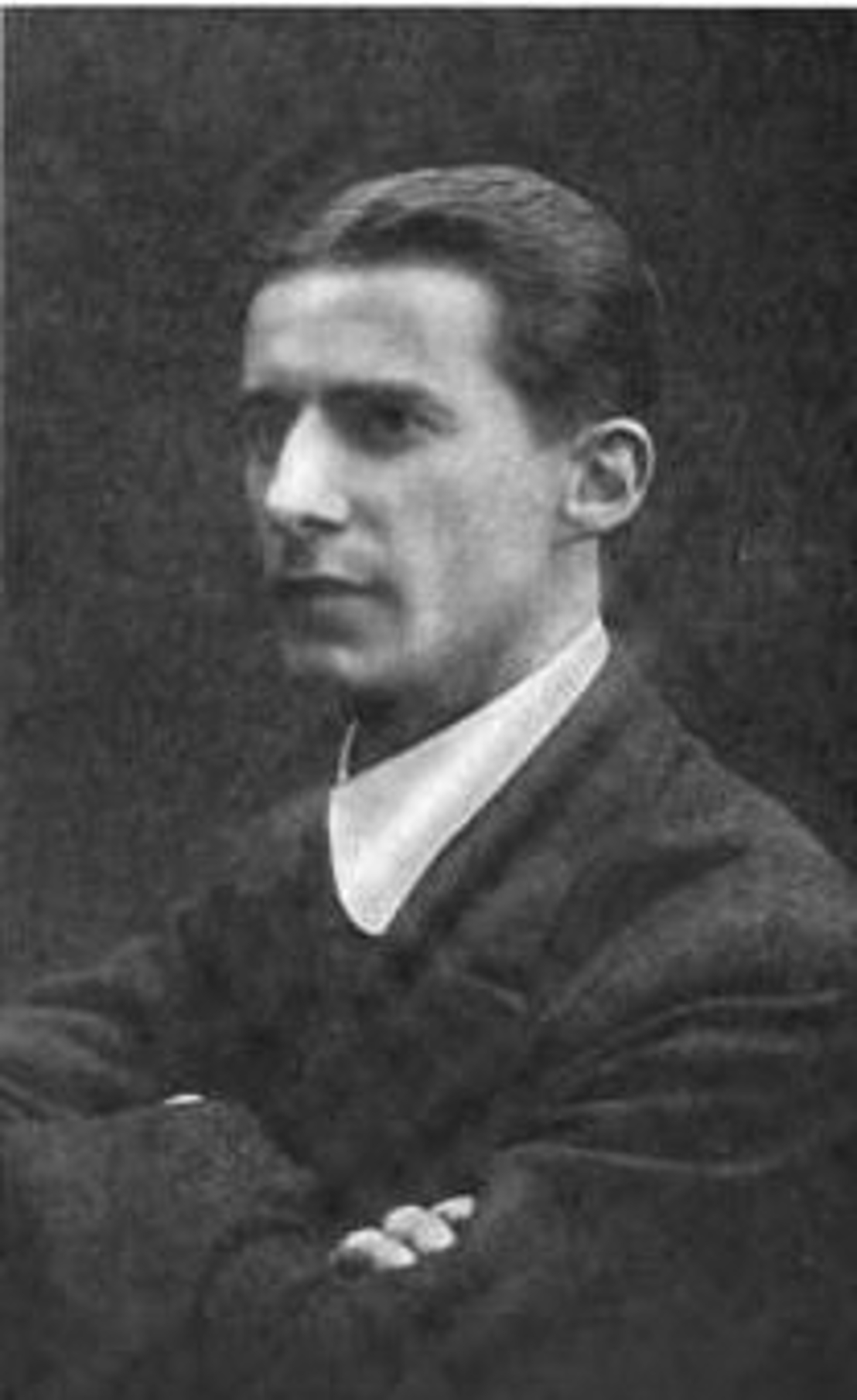
- Born: March 22, 1874; Stourbridge
- Died: May 10, 1965 (aged 91)
- Occupation: Organist
- Spouse: Mary Grindall Brayton
- Children: Barbara Gunhilda Moody; Brian Elgar Moody; Brenda Moody
- Parents: Charles Moody; Lydia Glover

Dr Charles Harry Moody Hon. FRCO (22 March 1874 – 10 May 1965) was a composer and organist based in England.

== Life ==
He was born in Stourbridge, Worcestershire on 22 March 1874, the son of Charles Moody (1825–1893) and Lydia Glover (1829–1904)

He studied organ under T. Westlake Morgan at Bangor Cathedral.

He married Mary Grindall Brayton in 1899 in Wigan. The marriage produced:

- Barbara Gunhilda Moody (b. 1899)
- Brian Elgar Moody (b. 1902)
- Brenda Moody (b. 1913)

He was appointed CBE and Hon FRCO in 1920.

He was also a lecturer in music at the Diocesan Training College in Ripon from 1902 to 1952.

== Appointments ==
- Organist of St. Michael's College, Tenbury
- Assistant organist of Wells Cathedral 1894–1895
- Organist at All Saints' Church, Wigan 1895–1899
- Organist at Holy Trinity Church, Coventry 1899–1902
- Organist at Ripon Cathedral 1902–1954
- Conductor of the Halifax Choral Society 1917–1922 (John A. Hargreaves: "Every Valley Shall be Exalted, Halifax Choral Society 1818–2018")

== Works ==
=== Books ===
- Church Music
- The Choir Boy in the Making
- Selby Abbey
- Ripon Cathedral
- Fountains Abbey

=== Compositions ===
- Communion Service in B flat
- Magnificat and Nunc Dimittis in D minor
- Anthem: Before the ending of the day
- Anthem: Except The Lord Keep The House
- Hymn: O Spirit Of Our God

Cultural offices
Preceded by Edwin Crow	Organist and Master of the Choristers of Ripon Cathedral; 1902-1954	Succeeded by Lionel Dakers
