= Clement Charlton Palmer =

English organist

Clement Charlton Palmer (1871–1944) was a cathedral organist, who served at Canterbury Cathedral.

== Background ==
Clement Charlton Palmer was born on 26 April 1871 in Barton-under-Needwood in Staffordshire. His father, Dr. Clement Palmer, was the local general practitioner.

He was educated at the Derby School of Music and at Repton School.

He was a composer. His compositions include a morning and evening service in E flat, an evening service in F minor, morning and evening service in F for men's voices, Casabianca ballad for chorus and orchestra.

His best known works for solo organ are the three sets of twelve "Studies on Old English Hymn Tunes".

He also wrote at least two chamber works: a trio for piano, violin and cello dated 1905, and a quartet for piano, flute, horn and bassoon.

== Career ==
Assistant organist of:

- Lichfield Cathedral 1890–1897

Organist of:

- St Leonard's Church, Wychnor 1887
- St Andrew's Church, Pau, France 1888–1890
- Holy Trinity Church, Burton upon Trent 1891–1897
- St Laurence Church, Ludlow 1897–1908
- Canterbury Cathedral 1908–1936

Cultural offices
Preceded by Harry Crane Perrin	Organist and Master of the Choristers of Canterbury Cathedral; 1908-1936	Succeeded by Gerald Hocken Knight
