= Thomas Armstrong (musician) =

British musician (1898–1994)

Sir Thomas Armstrong
- Armstrong by John Aubrey, 1970
- Born: 15 June 1898; Peterborough
- Died: 26 June 1994 (aged 96); Olney, Buckinghamshire, England
- Education: Keble College, Oxford
- Occupations: Organist; Conductor; Composer; Educationalist
- Relatives: Robert Armstrong (son)
- Military career
- Allegiance: United Kingdom
- Branch: British Army
- Service years: 1916-1919
- Unit: Royal Artillery
- Conflicts: World War I

Sir Thomas Henry Wait Armstrong (15 June 1898 – 26 June 1994) was an English organist, conductor, composer and educationalist. He was from a musical family and his early career was as a church and cathedral organist. From the 1920s onwards he was a broadcaster for the BBC giving talks as well as playing.

While organist and faculty member of Christ Church, Oxford Armstrong combined academic work with practical musicianship, as player and conductor. From 1955 to 1968, he was principal of the Royal Academy of Music (RAM), London, where he was known for his concern for the well-being of his staff and students and his efforts to strengthen links with overseas music colleges.

== Life and career ==
=== Early years ===
Armstrong was born in Peterborough, the eldest of three children, and only son, of Amos Ebenezer Armstrong (1878–1950) and his wife Elizabeth Annie West, née Handford (1880–1939). His mother was a former headmistress, and his father was a leading figure in Peterborough's musical life, music master at the King's School, organist and choirmaster at St Augustine's church, Woodston, and conductor of the local operatic, orchestral, and choral societies. The young Armstrong was a chorister at the Chapel Royal, St James's Palace from 1907 to 1910, during which time he sang at the funeral of King Edward VII in Westminster Abbey.

In 1912 Armstrong was appointed organist of Thorney Abbey, and the following year he was articled to Haydn Keeton, organist of Peterborough Cathedral. A fellow apprentice, Malcolm Sargent, later known as a conductor, became a lifelong friend. They liked to trace their musical ancestry back to Mozart: Keeton had been articled to George Elvey, who was articled to Thomas Attwood, who was articled to Mozart.

=== Early career ===
In 1915–16, Armstrong was assistant organist in Peterborough for a year before being elected organ scholar of Keble College, Oxford. His studies were interrupted by service in France during the First World War; he enlisted with the Royal Artillery in 1916, before being commissioned towards the end of the war. During his war service he met Ralph Vaughan Williams, whom Armstrong later described as "the greatest influence of anybody on my life". Armstrong remained in France for some months after the cessation of hostilities, not returning to England until 1919; he rented a room with a piano in Cambrai to get himself back in practice.

After the war Armstrong completed his studies, studying music with Hugh Allen and organ under Henry Ley at Christ Church. He graduated with a BA in modern history in 1921 and took his BMus in 1922.

After leaving Oxford in 1922 Armstrong briefly took up an appointment at Manchester Cathedral (assistant organist), during which time he worked with Hamilton Harty. The following year he was appointed organist of St. Peter's Church, Eaton Square, London. During this period he studied at the Royal College of Music with Holst and Vaughan Williams. In 1926 Armstrong married Hester Draper, daughter of the Rev W H Draper, Master of the Temple. They were married for 52 years and had two children: Robert (later Baron Armstrong of Ilminster) (1927-2020) and Helen Hilary (b. 1930).

In 1927 Armstrong made his first broadcast, in an organ recital for the BBC, playing music ranging from Buxtehude to Stanford and Parry; his long association with the BBC included many talks on the radio about topics such as British music. In 1928 he completed the three compositions required for the award of a Dmus: A Passer-By (a rhapsody for baritone, chorus and orchestra), a Fantasy Quintet for pianoforte and strings, and Friends Departed (for soprano, chorus and orchestra). From 1928 to 1933 he was organist of Exeter Cathedral, a post he held in tandem with the directorship of music at the University College of the South West.

=== Oxford and Royal Academy of Music ===
Armstrong returned to Oxford in 1933 as organist of Christ Church in succession to William Harris who had been appointed to St George's Chapel, Windsor. He was also conductor of the Oxford Orchestra and Oxford Bach Choir, and president of the Musical Club and Union. In 1939 the governing body of Christ Church elected him a student (the equivalent of a fellowship in other colleges), the first organist to receive that honour. His son has written that Amstrong "found the wider academic community deeply congenial, especially the Senior Common Room at Christ Church … For him, Oxford was, and remained, a spiritual home." When Allen died, after a road accident in 1946, Armstrong hoped to be appointed to succeed him as professor of music at the university, but the post was given to Jack Westrup.

In 1955 Armstrong was appointed principal of the Royal Academy of Music. The Times later commented on this period:

It was entirely typical of Armstrong that at this stage, aged 57, he should take up playing the double bass, receiving lessons from one of his own staff. Supported by his wife Hester, who provided a refuge of comfort and affection for literally thousands of students, he guided the Academy's often shaky fortunes with wisdom, foresight and humanity for the next 13 years.

As well as his concern for the well-being of his students and staff, Armstrong worked to develop links between the RAM and conservatoires of music in other European countries.

In addition to his RAM duties, Armstrong was prominent in other aspects of British musical life. He was senior adviser to the Delius Trust, chairman of the Royal Philharmonic Society, a member of the Countess of Munster Trust, a member of the board of directors of the Royal Opera House, a Governor of the Old Vic-Sadler's Wells Foundation, chairman of the governors of the Central Tutorial School for Young Musicians (founded in 1962), now renamed the Purcell School, and chairman of the Musicians Benevolent Fund.

Armstrong was knighted in 1958 and retired in 1968, when he was 70. He and his wife moved to the village of Newton Blossomville in Buckinghamshire, close to the Bedfordshire border. There he formed and conducted a village choir, which won several prizes in music festivals. After the death of his wife in 1982, he moved to Olney, a few miles away, sharing a cottage with Rosemary Rapaport, his former colleague from the RAM. Robert Armstrong recalled that in Olney, when already ninety years old, Armstrong "was delighted to be sought out, as 'the old man in East Street who plays the organ', to play for Mass at the local Roman Catholic church for six months."

Armstrong died at his home in Olney at the age of 96.

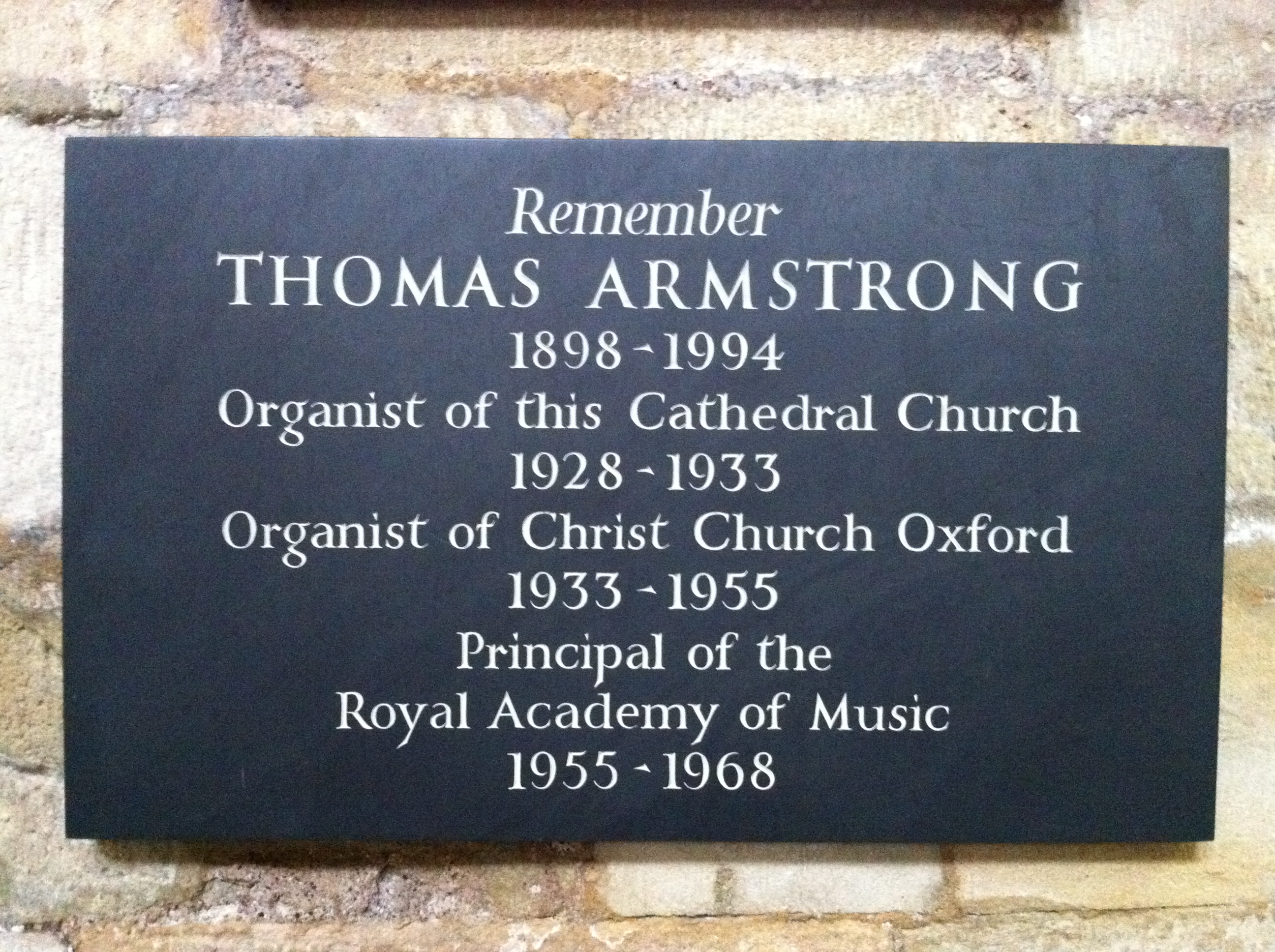
Memorial in Exeter Cathedral

== Compositions ==
Armstrong was modest about his music, although he composed all his life, despite the other demands on his time. For his Who's Who entry he confined himself to seven words on the subject: " Compositions: various, the larger ones remain unpublished." He admitted that he had not lived up to Vaughan Williams's advice that "if you write a little bit of music to the best of your ability on every day of your life you will write one good piece before you die." He continued to compose into his nineties: "I still try to write a little music in my antiquated idiom. But I suppose nothing is so antiquated as what was avant-garde five years ago".

Amrstrong composed 25 anthems, carols, services and a large number of songs. The ambitious secular works composed for his doctorate remained unperformed until after his death, when they were recorded on a Chandos CD. His biographer Richard Stoker writes that Armstrong "belonged to the gentle English tradition of Parry, Vaughan Williams, Howells, and Finzi".

== Notes ==
Cultural offices
Preceded by Ernest Bullock	Organist and Master of the Choristers of Exeter Cathedral; 1928–1933	Succeeded by Alfred William Wilcock
Preceded by William Henry Harris	Organist and Master of the Choristers of Christ Church Cathedral, Oxford; 1933–1955	Succeeded by Sydney Watson
