= Harry Crane Perrin =

Harry Crane Perrin (19 August 1865 – 6 November 1953) was a cathedral organist at Canterbury Cathedral, England, and an academic who served as the first dean of music at McGill University, Canada.

== Background ==
Perrin was born in Wellingborough, Northamptonshire. He attended Wellingborough Grammar School, and studied music under Sir Robert Prescott Stewart at Trinity College, Dublin, graduating with a Bachelor of Music in 1890, as a Fellow of the Royal College of Organists in 1892, and as a Doctor of Music in 1901.

He composed the cantatas "Abode of Worship" and "Pan's Pipes" (both published by Breitkopf), Song of War (published by Weekes), morning and evening services, anthems, hymn tunes and songs (some of which were published by Novello & Co).

He was organist at St Columba's College, Dublin, at Lowestoft, and, following a competition on the organ at Westminster Abbey, at Coventry Cathedral. He was organist and choirmaster at Canterbury Cathedral for ten years. In 1908, he moved to Canada to take up an appointment as professor of music at McGill University in Montreal and director of the Conservatorium and was presented to King Edward VII prior to his departure. Perrin restructured the curriculum at the Conservatorium so that instead of simply learning an instrument or singing, students also studied the history and theory of music. In 1920, a Faculty of Music was established at the university, and Perrin was its first dean until his retirement in 1930. He also established an orchestra and a choir there, and developed a Canada-wide system of musical examinations.

He married Enid Hilda Pridmore in Coventry in 1896; they had one son and one daughter.Perrin died at his home in Exeter, Devon, in 1953.

== Career ==
Organist of:

- St. Columba's College, Rathfarnham 1886 - 1888
- St. John's Church, Lowestoft 1888 - 1892
- St. Michael's Church, Coventry 1893 - 1898
- Canterbury Cathedral 1898 - 1908

Cultural offices
Preceded by William Henry Longhurst	Organist and Master of the Choristers of Canterbury Cathedral; 1898-1908	Succeeded by Clement Charlton Palmer
