= The Miracle at Cardenrigg =

Scottish novel

First edition (UK)

The Miracle at Cardenrigg is a novel by the Scottish writer Tom Hanlin published in 1949 by Victor Gollancz in the UK and Random House in the US.

== Plot ==
Two hundred miners are trapped underground. The story of their survival involves both adventure and suspense.

== See also ==
- "review of The Miracle at Caredenrigg". The Times Literary Supplement. 22 July 1949.
- "Disaster And Faith; Miracle at Caredenrigg". The New York Times. 28 August 1949.
- "review of The Miracle at Cardenrigg". The Observer. 10 July 1949.
