= St George's Church, Derby =

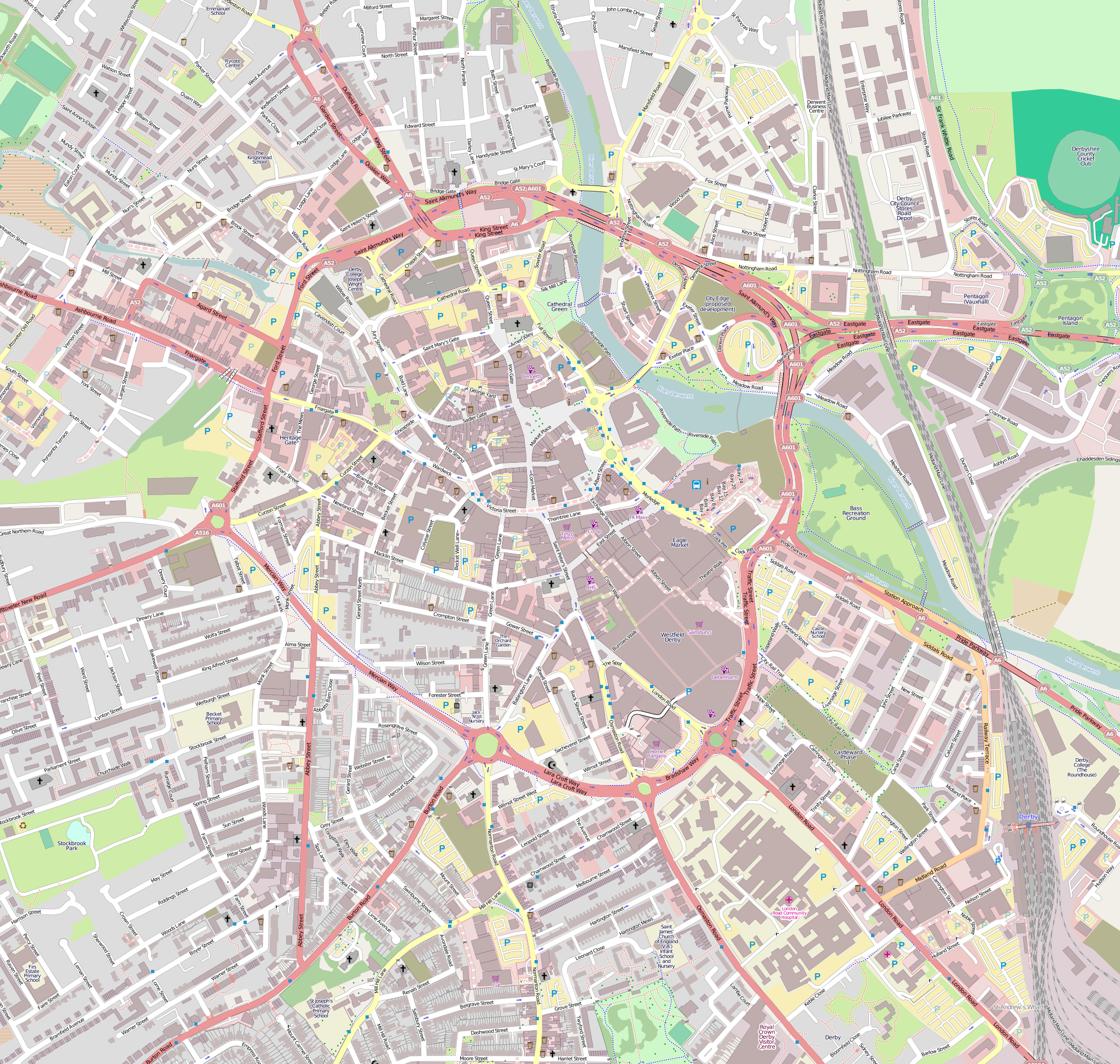
- Location within Derby
- 52°54′47″N 1°29′28.4″W
- Location: Derby, Derbyshire
- Country: England
- Denomination: Church of England

History
- Dedication: St George

Architecture
- Architect: A Macphearson
- Groundbreaking: 18 October 1889
- Completed: 11 September 1890
- Closed: 26 December 1937

St George's Church, Derby was a Church of England mission church in Derby, Derbyshire from 1890 to 1937.

== History ==
The rapid growth of the population on the Firs Estate lying between St Luke's Church, Derby and Burton Road stimulated the provision of a new church. Initially a Mission Chapel in Leman Street was opened in June 1880 by Edward Bickersteth (Dean of Lichfield) but this soon proved too small for the demand.

To stimulate fundraising, a memorial stone for a new church was laid by Mrs Henry Boden on 8 September 1887. The foundation stone for the church was laid by Sir William Evans, 1st Baronet on 18 October 1889. The architect was A. Macphearson, and Walker and Slater of Derby were the contractors. The chancel was completed and opened on 11 September 1890.

A reredos was provided in 1895 obtained second hand from St Paul's, Burton upon Trent.

The church was closed after a final service held on 26 December 1937 after the Bishop decided not to create a separate parish, and the congregation was re-incorporated into that of St Luke's Church, Derby. It was demolished in 1938.

== Organ ==
An organ was installed by Bishop and Son and opened on 22 March 1899 by George Pattman, organist of All Saints’ Church, Scarborough. The only organist for the church was R.T. Orme who was in post from 1899 to 1937.
