= George Heath-Gracie =

English musician

George Handel Heath-Gracie FRCO (4 June 1892 – 20 April 1987) was an English musician. He was Head Teacher at Derby School of Music (1938–1944), a composer and cathedral organist, who served in Derby Cathedral.

George Handel Heath-Gracie was born in Gosport, Hampshire, and educated at Bristol Grammar School.

He was the organist of St. Peter's Church, Brockley, Kent (1918–1933) and Derby Cathedral (1933–1958).

Cultural offices
Preceded by Alfred William Wilcock	Organist and Master of the Choristers of Derby Cathedral; 1933-1958	Succeeded by Wallace Michael Ross
