= Wallace Michael Ross =

British organist, music director and educator (1920–2010)

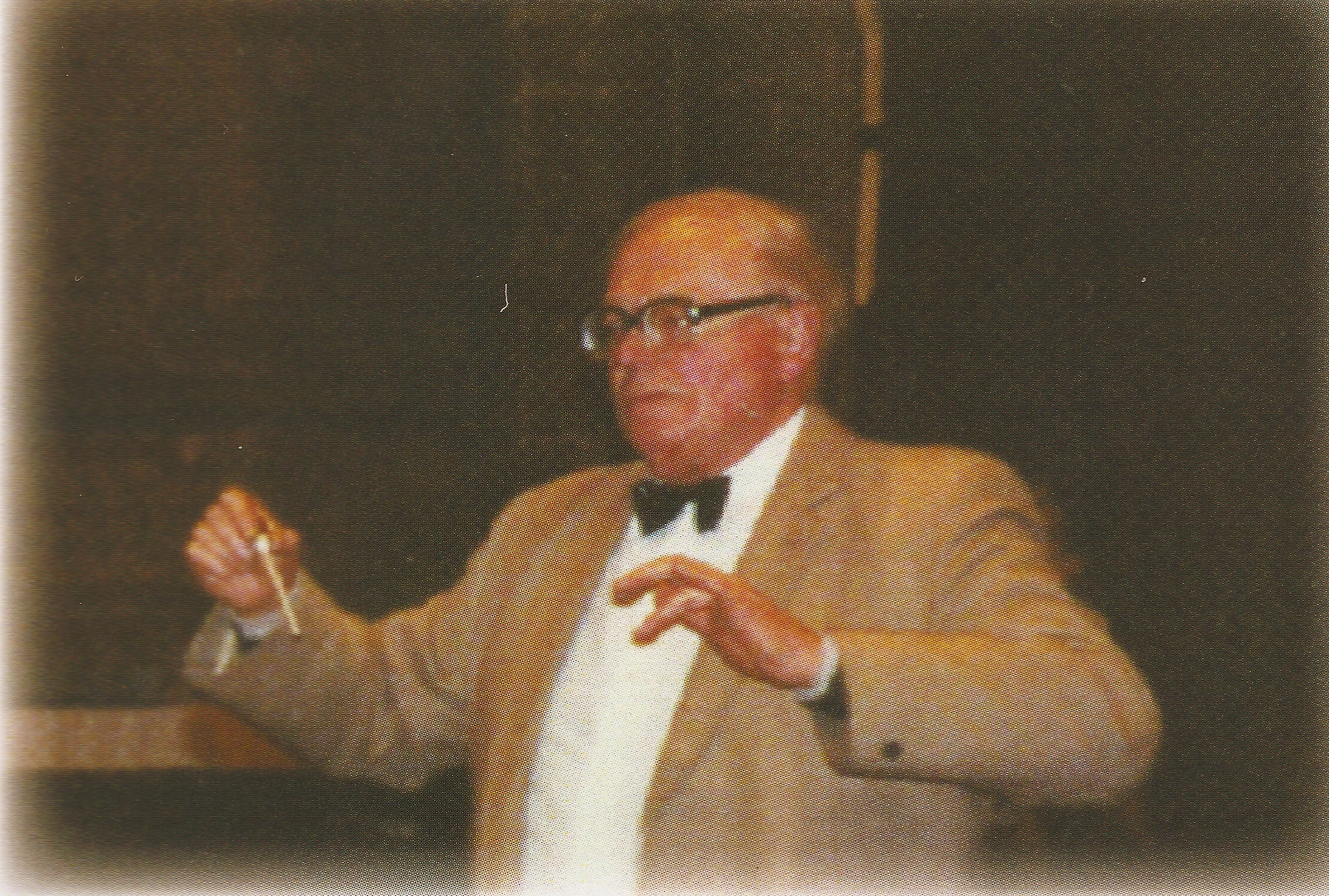
- Born: 19 November 1920; Yeovil, Somerset, England
- Died: 20 January 2010 (aged 89)
- Education: Balliol College, Oxford
- Occupations: Organist; music director; educator
- Years active: 1939–1980s
- Style: Classical
- Military career
- Allegiance: United Kingdom
- Branch: British Army
- Rank: Sergeant
- Units: 119th Light Anti-Aircraft Regiment, Royal Artillery; 7th Anti-Aircraft Division
- Conflicts: World War II

Wallace Michael Ross (19 September 1920 – 20 January 2010) was a British organist, music director and educator. He founded the Derby Bach Choir, the Master of Music at Derby Cathedral, was assistant organist at several great English Cathedrals and was a teacher of languages and music at several schools, including Sturgess School in Derby. He also founded the Derby Cathedral Brass Ensemble and the Derby Sinfonia.

== Life and achievements ==
Wallace Ross was born in Yeovil. His father was a businessman with a pharmaceutical firm in Cambridge.

He attended King's College Choir School, not as a chorister but as an ordinary pupil. After this, he attended Rugby School and he followed Edward Heath at Balliol College, Oxford, as Organ Scholar. World War II interrupted his studies, and Ross served as a gunner in Dover and Northern Ireland, becoming a sergeant and an instructor in aircraft recognition. It is believed that at this time he met his "sweetheart", never to find a life together with her. After the war, he continued at Balliol but did not achieve the doctorate he sought.

After Balliol, Ross articled at Chichester Cathedral to Horace Hawkins, also known as "Daddy Hawkins", where Ross's eccentricities were hinted at by Hawkins's nickname for him, "Buffalo Bill". Apparently, Ross was not daunted when he had been locked out of the organ loft. He climbed up in an unregulated way to the loft, "up and over". Posts of assistant organist were to follow, at Beverley Minster, Leicester Cathedral and Gloucester Cathedral. During these appointments, Ross was pursuing his career as teacher of music, classics, physical therapy and rugby at various schools.

At Leicester, he was music master at Alderman Newton's School. His talent for performing and teaching music was established. Joining the Railway Workingman's club, Ross extended his expertise playing with the band on the tuba. His hobbies of a glass of ale and railway mania were fulfilled.

In 1958, Ross was appointed organist at Derby Cathedral. Working as a teacher of languages, history and music at Sturgess School, he rapidly became well-loved in the city. He coached and refereed Rugby Football over the years in Derby.

Ross's work as organist and master of music at the Cathedral took off at the enthronement of Bishop Geoffrey Allen in 1959. He wanted a fanfare to greet the Bishop; however, he knew of no local musicians that might undertake the task. He got on to his network to get up a team of brass players from ex-pupils and acquaintances. Bishop Allen was greeted by what became the Derby Cathedral Brass Ensemble.

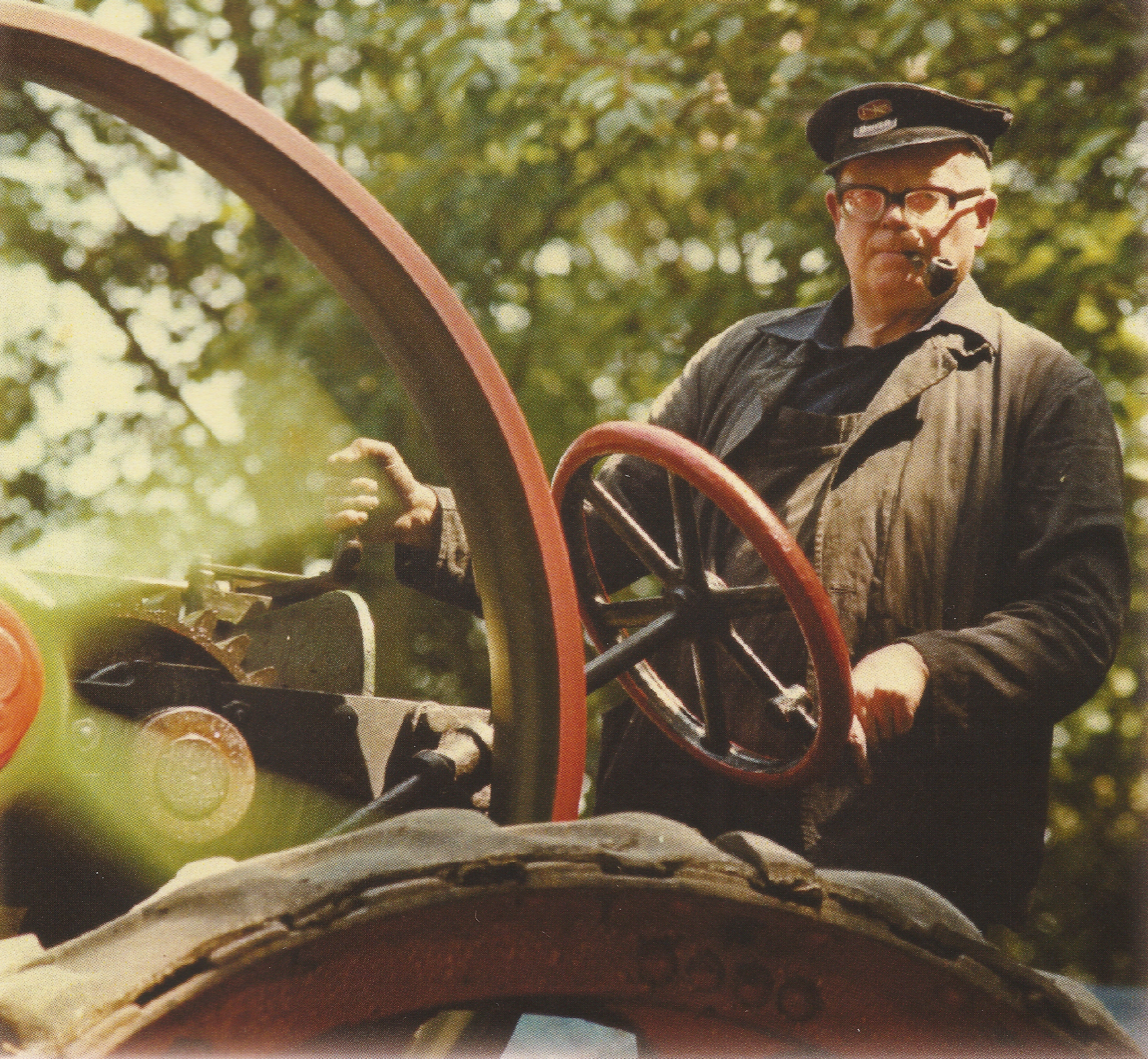
Ross driving a traction engine

In 1969, Ross founded the Derby Bach Choir. This body made joyous sounds and improved the singing skills of many in Derby. Soloists were national singers from London. The choir's repertoire included challenging works of many modern composers.

Ross frequently displayed eccentricities, some of which derived from his love of railway steam engines. Many pupils and colleagues witnessed him walking along and pretending to be an engine (and its driver). Finding it hard to adapt to a changing world, he liked to do things in his own way. This caused problems, and some were not very tolerant. Ross found himself out of a job or two during his career. The last occasion of this was at the Cathedral when a new Provost felt that a new broom was required. The Parish of Kegworth gained from this as Ross became organist there. Ross later spoke warmly of his time there and of the Rector.

Although he had not married and had no family, he formed, in later life, a strong and lasting family bond with the Cartwright family.

== Appointments ==
- King's Coll. S., Cambridge; Rugby S. (Sch.) 1933–1938; R. Coll. Music
- 1938–1939: Balliol
- 1939: Organist at Balliol College, Oxford
- 1939–1940 and 1945–1947: Sch; Kitchener Sch; Organ Sch; Jasper Ridley Prize; Masefield Studentship; MA 1946; BMus. 1949
- Army 1940, gunner RA Light AA; 199th Bty. in Kent and Essex
  - 1941–1942: N. Ireland
  - 1942–1943: Sergt.
  - 1943: Instr., 7th AA Gp School in aircraft recognition, mines, and demolition
- 1944–1946: Articled Pupil, Chichester Cathedral
- 1947–1948: Director of Music, Pocklington School, Yorkshire
- 1948: Assistant Organist, Beverley Minster
- 1948: Limpus and Dr Read Prizes, FRCO 1950, CHM
- 1951–1954: Music Master, Alderman Newton's Boys' School, Leicester and 2nd Asst. (organist) Leicester Cathedral
- 1951: Dep. Bandmaster, Leicester Railwaymen's Silver Band
- 1952: Guest Conductor, "British United" Male Voice Choir
- 1953: Second Assistant Organist, Gloucester Cathedral and Director of Music, King's School, Gloucester
- 1954–1958: Assistant Organist at Gloucester Cathedral
- 1954: Dep. Conductor, Gloucester Festival Chorus and Glos. Orchestral Soc.
- 1958–1982: Organist and Master of the Music, Derby Cathedral
- 1958–1980: Music Master, Sturgess School (later Woodlands Community School), Derby
- Founder/Conductor, Derby Cath. Brass Ensemble 1959 (Derby St John's Brass Ensemble from 1982), Derby Bach Choir 1959–1990, Derby Cath. Orchestra 1966 (Derby Sinfonia 1982–1991)
- 1983: Organist, St Andrew's Church Kegworth
- 1980: Engineman, Cadeby Steam Centre

Cultural offices
Preceded by George Handel Heath-Gracie	Organist and Master of the Choristers of Derby Cathedral; 1958–1980	Succeeded by Peter David Gould
