= St Paul's, Burton upon Trent =

Church in England

Coordinates: 52.8082°N 01.6467°W

St Paul’s Church, Burton upon Trent
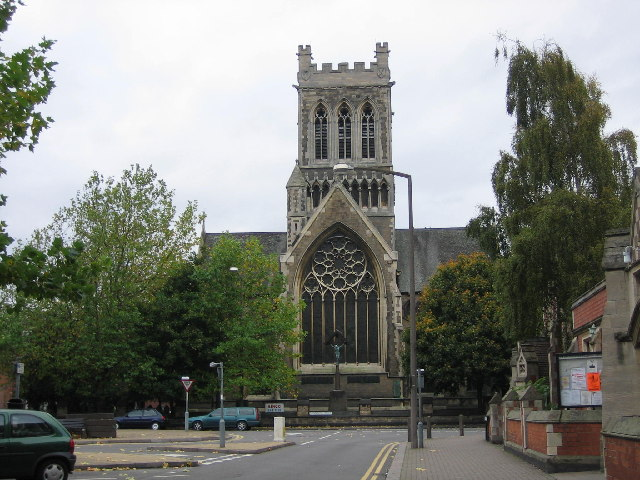
- St Paul’s Church, Burton upon Trent
- St Paul’s Church, Burton upon Trent
- Denomination: Church of England
- Churchmanship: Anglo Catholic
- Website: St Paul's webpage

Administration
- Province: Province of Canterbury
- Diocese: Diocese of Lichfield

Clergy
- Vicar: Fr Simon Archer

St Paul's Church is a Church of England parish church in Burton upon Trent, Staffordshire England. The church, on St Paul's Square and near the Town Hall, opened in 1874 and was designed by the architects James M. Teale and Edmund Beckett Denison (later created Lord Grimthorpe). Later additions are by G. F. Bodley. The building is listed as Grade II*.

The church is in the diocese of Lichfield. Since 2005, St Paul's has been part of a combined parish with St Aidan's, Shobnall (now closed). St Paul's is associated with St John the Divine, Horninglow; and is a joint benefice, sharing the vicar.

== History ==
A mission in Borough Road, Burton was opened in 1865 from Christ Church at the suggestion of Michael Thomas Bass. By 1872 the mission was known as St Paul's and in 1873, it was assigned an ecclesiastical district, created out of the parishes of Christ Church, Holy Trinity, and St Modwen's. A new church, St Paul's, was opened in 1874 on a site soon known as St Paul's Square, with Michael Thomas Bass paying for the erection of the church and vicarage at a cost of £50,000 (equivalent to £4,888,416 in 2025). The church was consecrated on 7 April 1874 by the Bishop of Lichfield, George Augustus Selwyn.

== The building ==
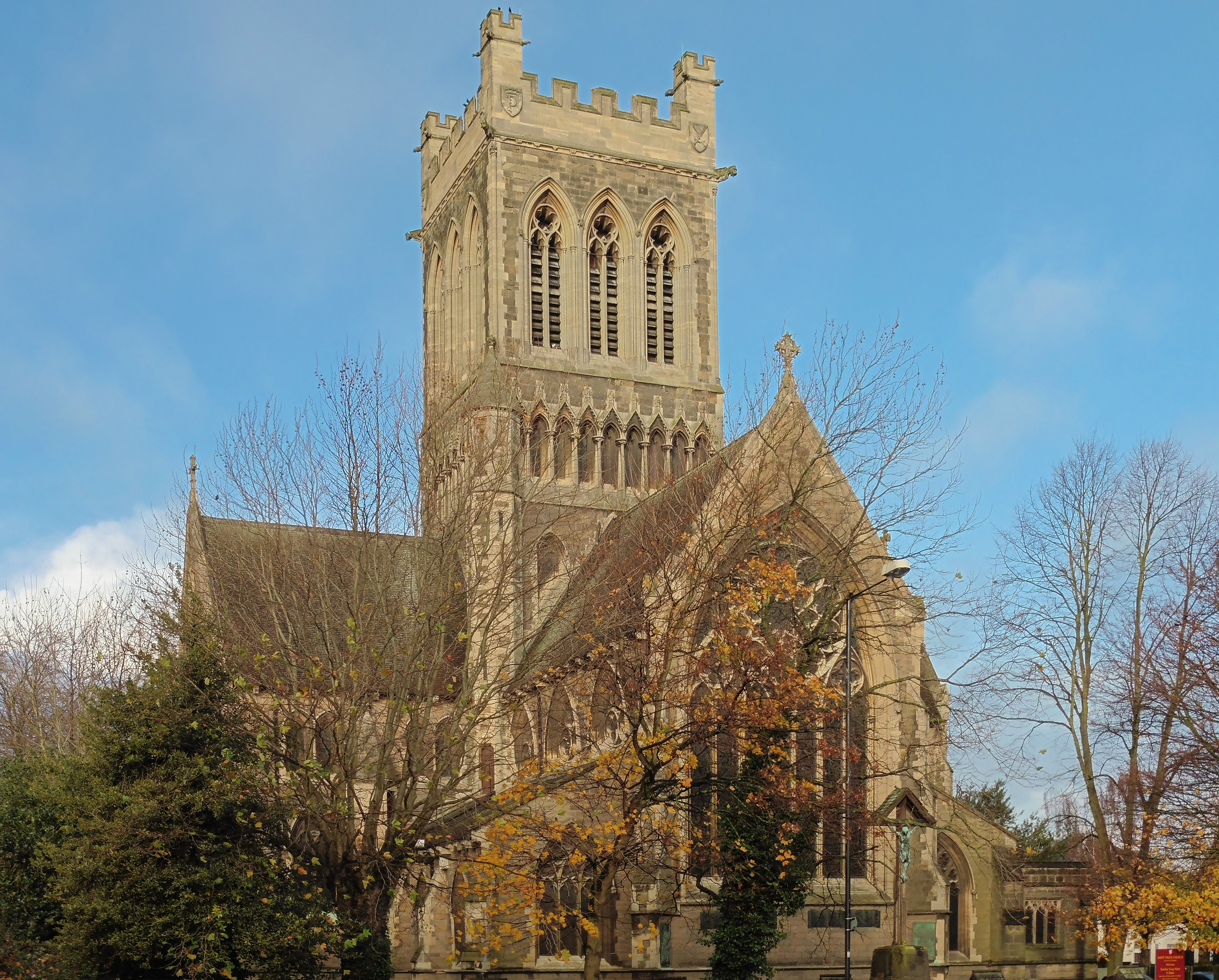
St Paul's from the south east

St Paul's church was built to the design of J. M. Teale of Doncaster with assistance from Sir Edmund Beckett Denison (later Edmund Beckett, 1st Baron Grimthorpe). It uses Coxbench and Ancaster stone in a geometrical, decorated style. The shape is cruciform with an aisled three-bay chancel, quatrefoil in cross section and five-bay nave, as well as north and south transepts, and a square central tower. The tower, of 123 feet, houses a ring of ten bells; the original eight bells were recast in 1912 and two further bells were added in 1922.

The column capitals and label stops throughout the church were designed by a S. Tinkler of Derby and show naturalistic foliage, fruit, and animals with those in the nave representing the twelve months of the year. All the windows have early decorated style tracery, with ballflower ornamentation in the chancel. The nave and transept clerestories have triple lancets, while the clerestories in the chancel have carved spherical triangles. The nave roof has traceried spandrels and principals supported on clustered wall shafts. There are six windows (one in the south aisle and five in the narthex) designed in an Arts and Crafts style by Archibald John Davies of the Bromsgrove Guild of Applied Arts. They date from 1919 to 1934.

Between 1889 and 1901 the eastern arm and south transept were considerably altered to the design of George Frederick Bodley, at the expense of Michael Bass, 1st Baron Burton. In 1889, the south chancel aisle was converted into a chapel for daily services and two years later an external sacristy was added on the north side of the chancel with an internal porch added to the south transept door.

The chancel and sanctuary roof were painted and a canopy was added to the original large circular stone pulpit. The organ cases, one in the chancel and one high in the south transept are both by Bodley. The chancel floor was also relaid with red and white marble. The reredos was replaced by one designed by ecclesiastical and architectural sculptor Robert Bridgeman that depicted the Crucifixion in a central panel of red shawk stone surrounded by the saints. The original reredos was transferred to St George's Church, Derby in 1895 and is now in St Christopher's, Ellistown.

A number of other changes were made in the 20th century, paid for primarily by parishioners. A western narthex was added in 1910 as a memorial to Baron Burton, who had died the previous year. A calvary war memorial was erected in the churchyard in 1920 and a bishop's chair of stone was built into the sanctuary wall in 1931. The two west bays of the nave and the narthex were converted into a church hall in 1979 and at the same time several items were added from the former chapel of ease of St Margaret, including a wooden lectern by Morris and Co., a painting of the Crucifixion by Charles Edgar Buckeridge which was placed by the south door, statues of Alpha and Omega which were added to the south chancel aisle chapel, a banner of the Queen of Heaven probably by the Comper school, and statues of St Margaret of Antioch and St Michael slaying the Dragon.

Arthur Mee wrote of the decoration of St Paul's: "All is nobly rich and beautiful in this wonderful church".

In 1950 the church became a Grade II* listed building.

== Organ ==
In 1894-5 the original three manual organ, by William Hill & Son of London, was replaced by a four manual organ, the first built entirely by the Hope-Jones Electric Organ Company Ltd. The Hope-Jones organ was itself replaced in 1985 when parts including the console were removed to the Theatre Organ Heritage Centre of the Lancastrian Theatre Organ Trust in Eccles, Greater Manchester. The Hill organ was moved to Trinity Methodist Church, in George Street in 1896, and then in 2012 to Sankt-Afra-Kirche in the Berlin suburb of Gesundbrunnen.

The church now contains an organ formerly in the Central Methodist Church, Saltergate, Chesterfield. It is in the north chancel aisle and its specification can be found on the Pipe Organ Register. The south transept organ case is now empty apart from a few large pipes from the earlier instruments.

=== List of organists ===
- Dr Arthur Blurton Plant, 1874–1914 (born in 1853 he was organist and choirmaster from the church's consecration in 1874 until his death. In forty years as organist of St Paul's, he only missed one Sunday.)
- Arthur William Keith Plant, 1914–40 (son of A. B. Plant)
- Dennis Townhill, 1942–43
- Walter Cox, 1945–68
- Terence W. Bennett, 1977–84 (transferred to St Modwen's.)

== Vicars ==
- James Henry Fish, 1874 until his death in 1887
- Frederic Hicks Beaven, 1887-1901 (later Bishop of Mashonaland)
- Joseph John Gabbett Stockley, MA, 1901-1918-1919 (later Canon of Lichfield Cathedral)
- Sydney George William Maitland, 1919–1927
- John Goodacre, 1927–1933
- Basil Henry Winterbotham, 1933–1944
- W. Willis Price, 1944-1959
- W. B. Woolley, 1958-1974
- Rev Ronald N. Whittingham, M.A, 1975-1980
- David Morris, 1981-1999
- Paul Andrew Farthing, 2005-2013
- William Stanley Monkhouse, 2014-2019 (also Vicar of St Modwen's Church)
