= William Henry Longhurst =

English organist and composer

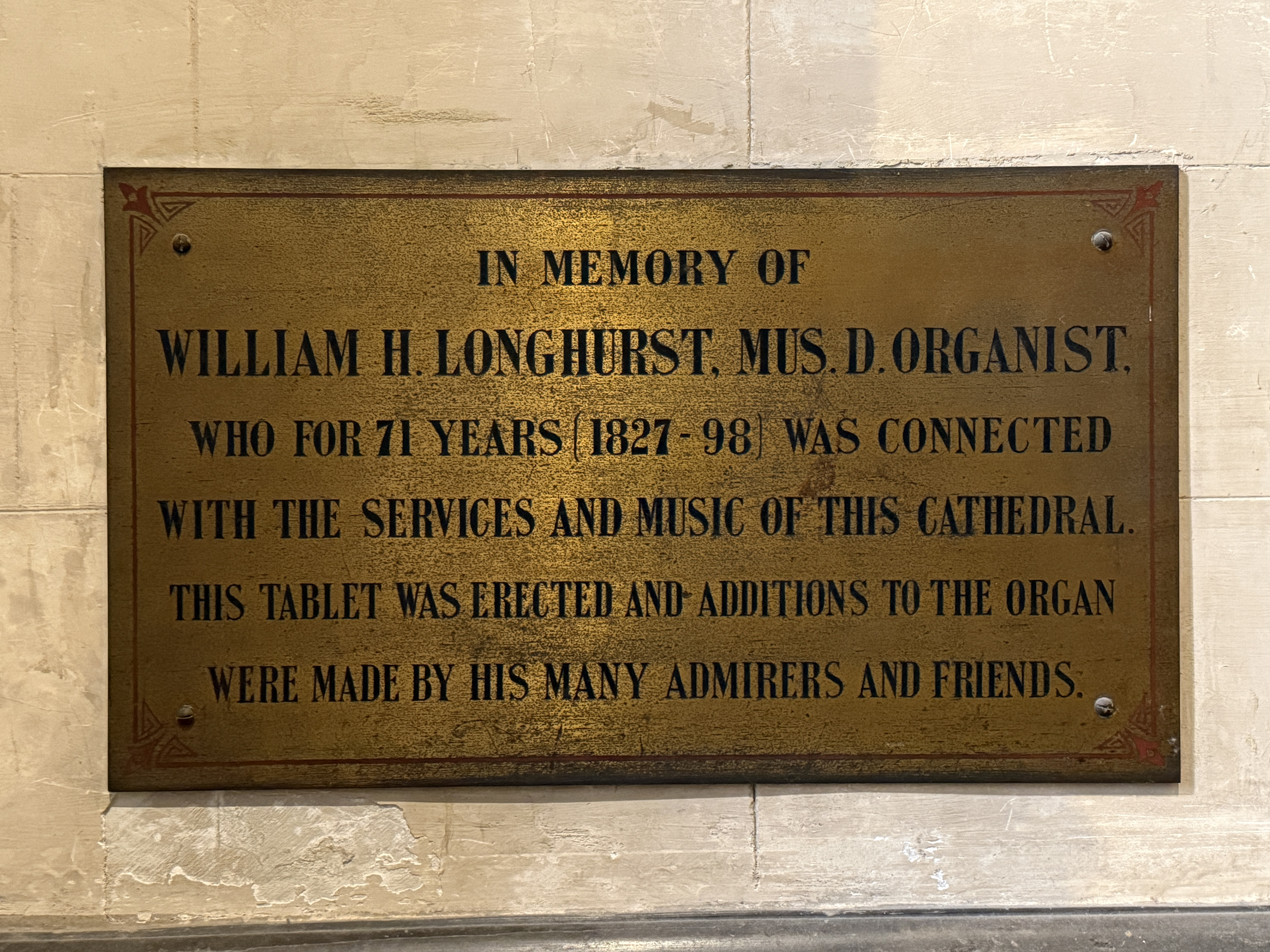
Memorial in Canterbury Cathedral

William Henry Longhurst (6 October 1819 – 17 June 1904) was an English organist at Canterbury Cathedral, and a composer.

== Life ==
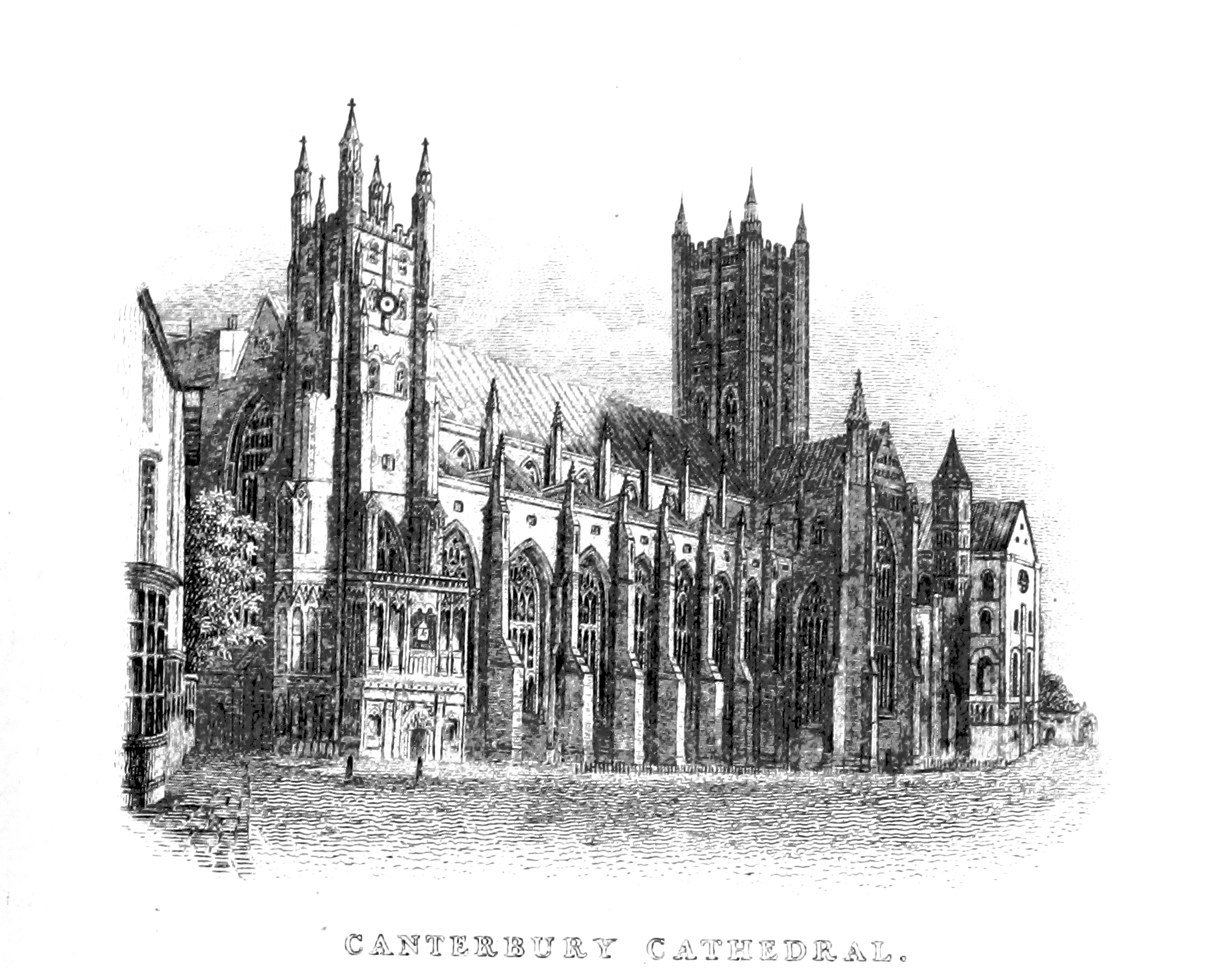
Canterbury Cathedral in 1842

He was born in Lambeth in 1819, son of James Longhurst, an organ-builder. In 1821 his father started business in Canterbury, and Longhurst began his seventy years' service for the cathedral there when he was admitted as a chorister in January 1828. He had lessons from the cathedral organist, Highmore Skeats, and afterwards from Skeats's successor, Thomas Evance Jones. In 1836 he was appointed under-master of the choristers, assistant organist and lay clerk. He was the thirteenth successful candidate for the fellowship diploma of the College of Organists, founded in 1864.

In 1873 he succeeded Jones as organist of Canterbury Cathedral, and held the post until 1898. His services were recognised by the dean and chapter in granting him, on his retirement, his full stipend, together with the use of his house in the cathedral precincts. The degree of DMus was conferred on him by the Archbishop of Canterbury in 1875. He died in Harbledown, Canterbury, on 17 June 1904.

== Works ==
As a composer Longhurst devoted himself chiefly to church music. His published works include twenty-eight short anthems in three books, and many separate anthems; a morning and evening service in E; a cantata for female voices, The Village Fair; an Andante and Tarantella for violin and piano; many hymn tunes, chants, songs, and short services. An oratorio, David and Absalom, and other works remained unpublished.

Cultural offices
Preceded by Thomas Evance Jones	Organist and Master of the Choristers of Canterbury Cathedral; 1873-1898	Succeeded by Harry Crane Perrin
