= Edward Francis Reginald Woolley =

British composer (1895–1954)

Edward Francis Reginald Woolley ARCO (13 May 1895 - 12 January 1954) was a composer and organist based in England.

== Life ==
He was born in Lincoln in 1895, the youngest son of Reginald Smith Woolley and Nora Francis Twentyman. He was educated at Lancing College and was a pupil of Dr. Gray at Trinity College, Cambridge.

He married Florence Elizabeth Dockray in 1915 in London.

== Appointments ==
- Assistant organist at Lincoln Cathedral 1926 - 1930
- Organist of St. Mary Magdalene, Newark 1930 - 1954

== Compositions ==
- Communion Services and other church music
- Hymn tune to Lift up your hearts
