= Alfred William Wilcock =

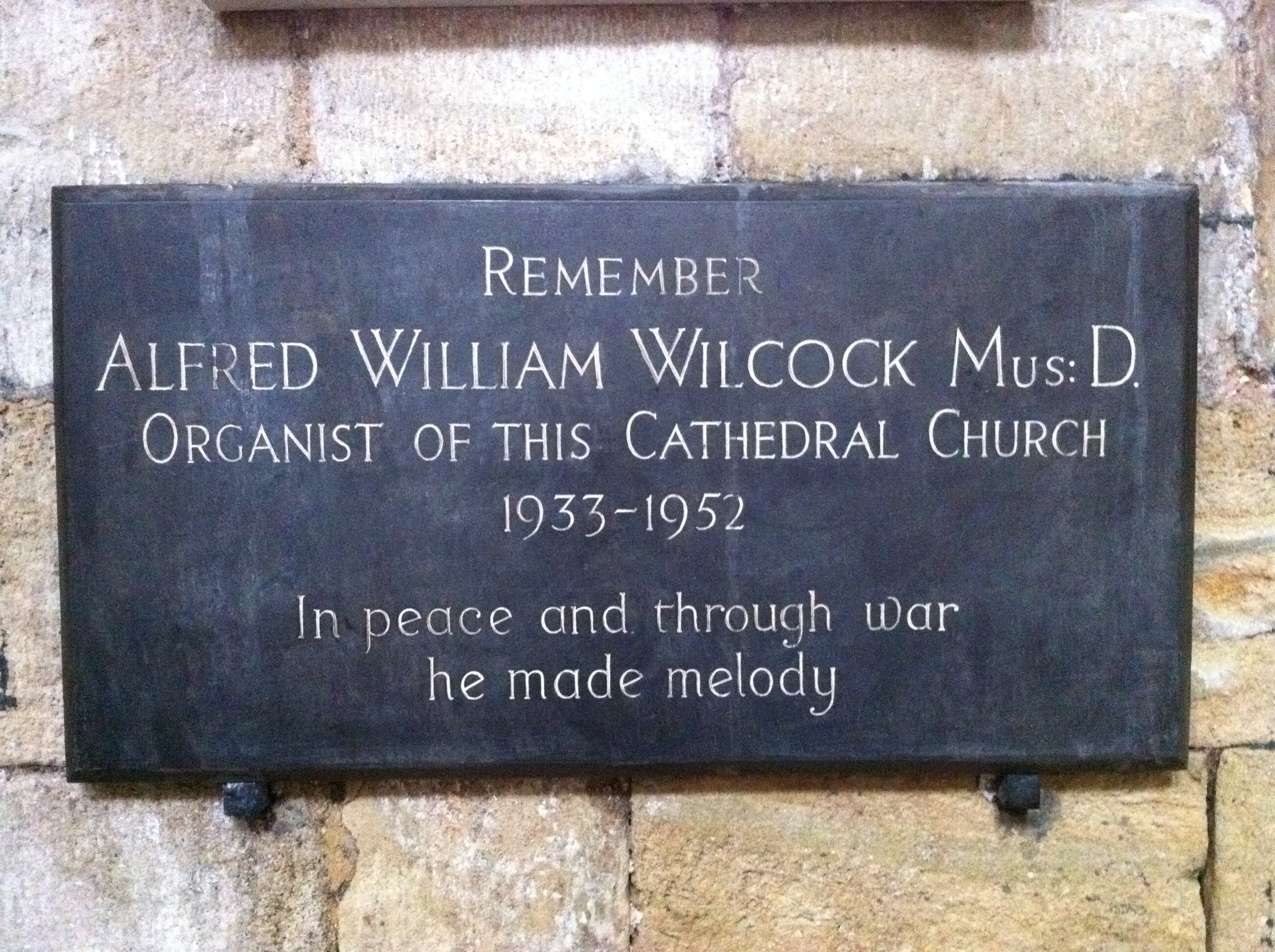
Memorial in Exeter Cathedral

Alfred William Wilcock (1887–1953) was a cathedral organist, who served in Derby Cathedral and Exeter Cathedral.

== Background ==
Alfred Wilcock was born on 21 October 1887 in Colne Lancashire.

He studied organ under James Kendrick Pyne at Manchester Cathedral.

== Career ==
Organist of:

- Derby Cathedral (1930–1933)
- Exeter Cathedral (1933–1952)

Cultural offices
Preceded by Arthur Griffin Claypole	Organist and Master of the Choristers of Derby Cathedral; 1930-1933	Succeeded by George Handel Heath-Gracie
Preceded by Thomas Armstrong	Organist and Master of the Choristers of Exeter Cathedral; 1933-1952	Succeeded by Reginald Moore
