= Reginald Moore =

English cathedral organist

Reginald Moore (1910–1968) was an English cathedral organist, who served in Exeter Cathedral.

== Background ==
Reginald Moore was born in Bramley, Leeds. He was a pupil of Sir Edward Bairstow and held several appointments as organist in and around Leeds before becoming assistant at Salisbury Cathedral in 1933. During the Second World War he served in the Royal Air Force. From 1947 to 1952 he was assistant music master at Winchester College. There were a number of BBC broadcasts of his organ recitals during his tenure at Exeter. In May 2010, Exeter Cathedral held a celebration Evensong marking the centenary of his birth, singing psalm chants and descants written by him.

== Career ==
Assistant Organist of:

- Salisbury Cathedral (1933–1947)

Organist of:

- Exeter Cathedral (1953–1957)

Cultural offices
Preceded by Alfred William Wilcock	Organist and Master of the Choristers of Exeter Cathedral; 1953-1957	Succeeded by Lionel Frederick Dakers
