= Richard Charles Hussey =

British architect (1806–1887)

R.C. Hussey
- Born: 1806
- Died: 1887 (aged 80–81)
- Occupation: Architect

Richard Charles Hussey (1806–1887), often referred to as R. C. Hussey, was a British architect. He was in partnership with Thomas Rickman from 1835, whose practice he assumed in 1838 with the latter's failing health; Rickman died on 4 January 1841.

== Works ==
- 1838: Bishop Ryder Church, Birmingham
- 1838-1839 Christ Church, Clevedon
- 1840: Restoration of St Margaret of Antioch Church, Church Street, Crick, Northamptonshire
- 1841: St Matthew's parish church, Warwick Street, Rugby, Warwickshire
- 1843: rebuilt west front of Holy Trinity parish church, Coventry
- 1843–4: restorations to Chester Cathedral, Cheshire
- 1844: rebuilt St Peter's parish church, Barford, Warwickshire
- 1844: raised roof of SS Mary and Nicholas parish church, Littlemore, Oxfordshire
- 1845: west tower of All Saints' parish church, Old Grendon, Warwickshire
- 1846: St John the Evangelist parish church, Stoke Row, Oxfordshire

1846 Clarke Stevenson Memorial,Deeping St Nicholas church Lincolnshire [Pevsner]

- 1846–8: rebuilt St Mary's parish church, Frittenden, Kent
- 1848–51: St John the Evangelist parish church, school and vicarage, Knypersley, Staffordshire
- 1849–50: St Saviour's parish church, Saltley, Birmingham
- 1850–51: rectory for St Michael's parish church, Winterbourne Steepleton, Dorset
- 1851–52: rebuilt nave of St Mary Magdalene parish church, Stockbury, Kent
- 1853–5: south arcade of St Catherine's parish church, Preston, Faversham, Kent
- 1854: rebuilt chancel, SS Peter and Paul parish church, Swalcliffe, Oxfordshire
- 1855: rebuilt chancel, St Margaret's Church, Halstead, Kent
- 1858: Rebuilt Nave and extended N. Transept St Mary and St Eanswythe's Church (1138), Folkestone, Kent
- 1859–62: south aisle at All Saints' parish church, Waldron, East Sussex
- 1860: rebuilt St Laurence parish church, South Weston, Oxfordshire
- 1861: spire and top of tower of St Martin of Tours parish church, Detling, Kent

== Sources ==
- Colvin, H.M. (1997). A Biographical Dictionary of British Architects, 1600-1840. New Haven: Yale University Press. ISBN 0-300-07207-4.
- Nairn, Ian; Pevsner, Nikolaus (1965). Sussex. The Buildings of England. Harmondsworth: Penguin Books. p. 619. ISBN 0-14-071028-0.
- Newman, John (1969). North East and East Kent. The Buildings of England. Harmondsworth: Penguin Books. ISBN 0-14-071039-6.
- Newman, John (1976) [1969]. West Kent and the Weald. The Buildings of England. Harmondsworth: Penguin Books. ISBN 0-14-071038-8.
- Newman, John (2012) [1969]. Kent: West and the Weald. The Buildings of England. Yale University Press. ISBN 978-0-30-018509-6.
- Newman, John; Pevsner, Nikolaus (1972). Dorset. The Buildings of England. Harmondsworth: Penguin Books. p. 397. ISBN 0-14-071044-2.
- Pevsner, Nikolaus (1974). Staffordshire. The Buildings of England. Harmondsworth: Penguin Books. p. 69. ISBN 0-14-071046-9.
- Pevsner, Nikolaus; Cherry, Bridget (revision) (1973) [1961]. Northamptonshire. The Buildings of England (2nd ed.). Harmondsworth: Penguin Books. ISBN 0-14-071022-1.
- Pevsner, Nikolaus; Hubbard, Edward (1971). Cheshire. The Buildings of England. Harmondsworth: Penguin Books. ISBN 0-14-071042-6.
- Pevsner, Nikolaus; Wedgwood, Alexandra (1966). Warwickshire. The Buildings of England. Harmondsworth: Penguin Books.
- Sherwood, Jennifer; Pevsner, Nikolaus (1974). Oxfordshire. The Buildings of England. Harmondsworth: Penguin Books. ISBN 0-14-071045-0.
