= Cuisset =

Cuisset is a French surname. Notable people with the surname include:

- Frank Frederick Cuisset (1812–1891), English composer and organist
- Paul Cuisset (born 1964), French programmer and video game designer
- Thibaut Cuisset (1958–2017), French photographer
