= Holy Trinity Church, Coventry =

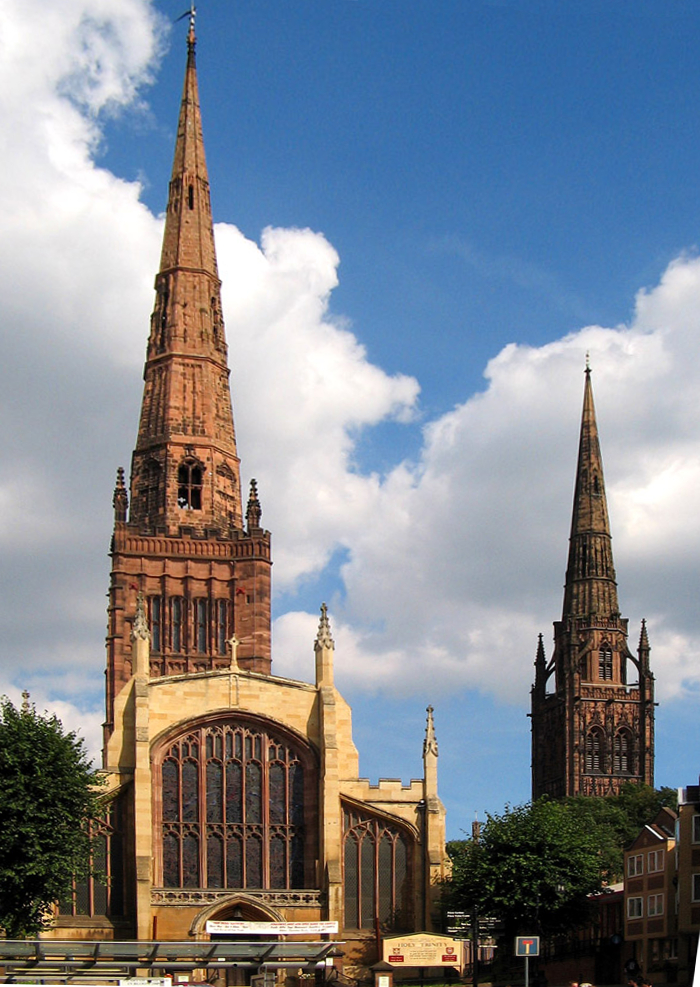
- Holy Trinity Church (left); the spire of the old St Michael's Cathedral is to the right
- Holy Trinity Church, Coventry
- 52°24′31″N 01°30′32″W
- OS grid reference: SP 33511 79052
- Denomination: Church of England
- Previous denomination: Roman Catholic
- Churchmanship: Broad Church
- Website: www.holytrinitycoventry.org.uk

History
- Dedication: Holy Trinity

Administration
- Province: Canterbury
- Diocese: Coventry
- Parish: Coventry

Clergy
- Vicar: Revd Richard Hibbert (from 2022)

Holy Trinity Church, Coventry, is a parish church of the Church of England in Coventry, West Midlands, England. Above the chancel arch is an impressive doom wall-painting.

== History ==
The church dates from the 12th century and is the only medieval church in Coventry that is still complete. It is 59 metres (194 ft) long and has a spire 72 metres (236 ft) high, one of the tallest non-cathedral spires in the UK.

The church was restored in 1665–1668, and the tower was recased in 1826 by Thomas Rickman. The east end was rebuilt in 1786 and the west front by Richard Charles Hussey in 1843.

The inside of the church was restored by George Gilbert Scott in 1854.

== Doom painting ==
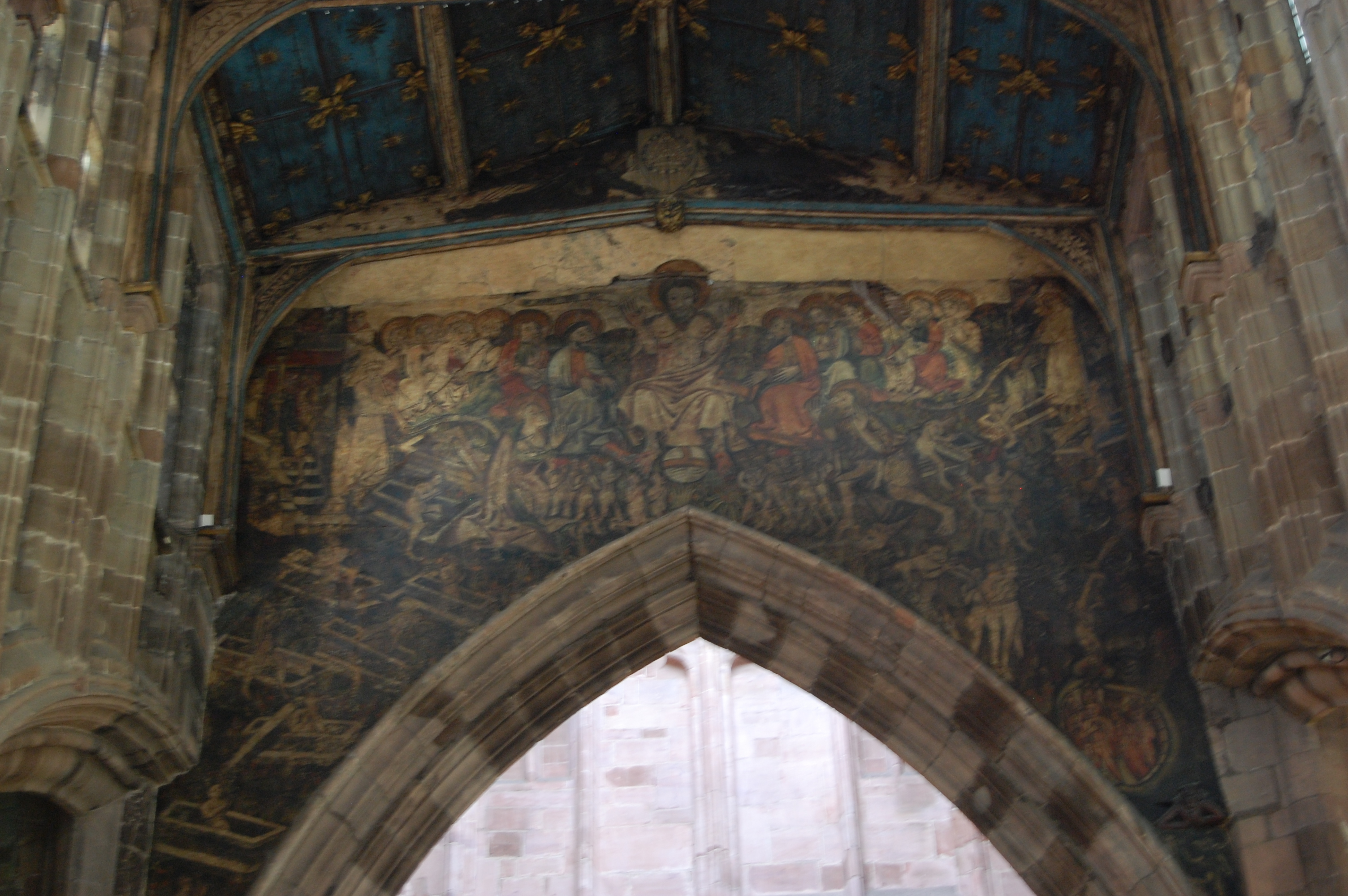
Doom painting in Holy Trinity Church

The doom wall-painting was painted above the tower arch in 1430s. It was discovered in 1831, covered by a lime wash, and was then restored and varnished over by David Gee. In the years following, the varnish darkened and hid the painting from view again. In 1995 conservation and restoration work was begun and the painting was revealed in 2004.

== Organ ==
The church had a pipe organ which had evolved over a long period of time with work by many builders, the last by Henry Willis & Sons. A specification of the organ can be found on the National Pipe Organ Register.

=== Timeline ===
- 1526: This is the earliest recorded organ, built by John Howe and John Clynmowe of London for £30. In the late 16th century it was dismantled as the Puritan clergy at Holy Trinity disapproved of organs
- 1631: Samuel Buggs (Vicar), "procured" a replacement instrument
- 1640s: Puritans back in charge, organ sold for £30
- 1732: German Thomas Swarbrick, who also supplied a new organ for Coventry Cathedral (Old Cathedral), built one for Holy Trinity for £600. It was placed upon a gallery erected for it across the Nave and had two manuals
- 1829: Swell and pedal added
- 1855–1861: As part of the George Gilbert Scott restoration of the church, a new organ chamber was built in the westernmost bay of the south chancel aisle. This instrument of three manuals plus pedals, was built by Forster and Andrews for £800
- 1900: Rebuilt by W. Hill & Sons with some of the old work incorporated; four manuals
- 1923: Electric blowing chest added
- 1933: J. Charles Lee of Coventry added pneumatic pistons
- 1961: Rebuilt for £12,200 by the firm of Henry Willis, the organ contained 59 speaking stops, each with 61 pipes, along with 30 couplers and 3 tremolos
- 2007: Organ was dismantled, due to it being beyond repair. A funding appeal has been launched for a new organ, which was to cost approximately £600,000.

=== List of organists ===
- William Lambe 1631–1640
- Mr. Harrison 1684–1696
- Mr. Spencer 1696–1731
- John Barker 1731–1752
- Capel Bond 1752–1790
- John Owen 1790–1797
- Matthew Payne 1797–1818
- Jane Lowe 1818–1856
- Edward Simms 1821–1822
- Frank Frederick Cuisset 1856–1860 (later organist of Bishop Ryder Church, Birmingham and St. Mary's Church, Selly Oak, Birmingham)
- H.J. Bailey 1860–1862 (formerly assistant organist of Ely Cathedral)
- Arthur Anwill Evans 1862–1866
- William Chater 1866–1880
- A. Hanson 1880–1899
- Charles Harry Moody 1899–1902 (later organist of Ripon Cathedral)
- Percy E. Hughes 1902 – ca. 1907 – ????
- Christie Green 1912 – 1918 (previously organist of Blackburn Parish Church, afterwards organist of St. Margaret's Church, Altrincham, Cheshire)
- Harold Bartrum Osmond 1918 – ca. 1931 – ???? (formerly organist of St Peters, Thanet)
- Leonard Tanner B Mus. FRCO. ca.1950–1960
- Martyn Lane – Organist and Master of the Choristers – 1965–1975
- Peter Johnson 1975–1979
- Andrew Moodie ca. 1981
- Jeremy Filsell – c. 1981
- Christopher Howard 1981–1990 – Director of Music.
- Indra Hughes 1990–1992 (Organist and Master of the Choristers)
- David Baxter – 1982–1991 – under baton of Christopher Howard and Indra Hughes
- Christopher Howard – Director of Music – 1992–2013.
- Alexander Norman – Director of Music – 2013–present

=== List of assistant organists ===
- Sullivan D.T. Mortimer ???? – ca.1900 (afterwards organist of St. Mary's Church, Atherstone)
- Norman Coke-Jephcott 1909–1911
- Harold Carpenter c.1950–60
- Peter Bourton c.1954–64. Afterwards Organist at St Marks, Bilton, Rugby.

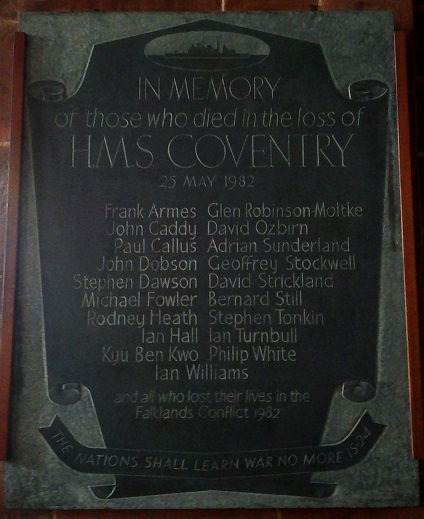
Memorial to the dead of HMS Coventry in the Falklands War 1982

== Notable clergy ==
- Rob Budd, curate 2013–2016
- Tony Burford, curate
- Hennie Johnston, curate 2003–2007
- James Hill, curate 2011–2013
- Anthony Francis Williams, curate 1950–1962
- Roy Windmill, curate 1967–1971

=== List of Vicars ===
Dates listed are of appointment, unless otherwise noted.

- Ralph de Sove, (no dates known)
- Henry de Harenhale, 1298
- John de Holland, 1334
- John Greneburgh, 1346
- Egidius Fillilod, 1349
- William Swet, 1380
- John de Amcotes, 1381
- John Brideston, (no dates known)
- William Gamell, 1383
- Nicholas Crosloy, 1421
- John Meneley, 1443
- Thomas Bowde, (no dates known)
- Thomas Orton, 1508
- Richard Collett, (no dates known)
- Nicholas Darington, 1527
- Roger Capp, (no dates known)
- William Benet, 1546
- George Brooche, 1554
- George Cheston, 1568
- Anthony Fletcher, 1576
- Humphrey Fenne, 1577
- Richard Eaton, 1590
- Thomas Cooper, 1604
- Samuel Gibson, 1610
- John Staresmore, 1618
- Samuel Buggs, 1626
- Henry Carpenter, 1633
- Joseph Brown, 1636
- Robert Proctor, 1638
- John Bryan, 1644
- Nathaniel Wanley, 1662
- Samuel Barton, 1680
- Jonathan Kimberley, 1681
- Samuel Kimberley, 1712
- John Macklin, 1734
- Nathaniel Gerard, 1752
- Joseph Rann, 1773
- John Davies, 1811
- Walter Farquhar Hook, 1828–1837 (afterwards Vicar of Leeds Parish Church)
- John Howells, 1837
- William Drake, 1857
- Alfred William Wilson, 1864
- Francis M. Beaumont, 1872–1912
- R. Basil Littlewood, 1912
- Acland F. O'N. Williams, 1929
- Graham W. Clitheroe, 1931
- Lawrence Jackson, 1965–1973 (later Provost of Blackburn)
- Nigel Douglas Blayney Abbott, 1973–1980 (later Provost of Oban)
- Graham Dow, 1981–1992 (later Bishop of Carlisle)
- David Andrew Urquhart, 1992–2000 (later Bishop of Birmingham)
- Gordon Keith Sinclair, 2001–2007 (later Bishop of Birkenhead)
- David Mayhew, 2009–2016
- Graeme Anderson, 2017-2021
- Richard Hibbert, from 2022

== Stained glass windows ==
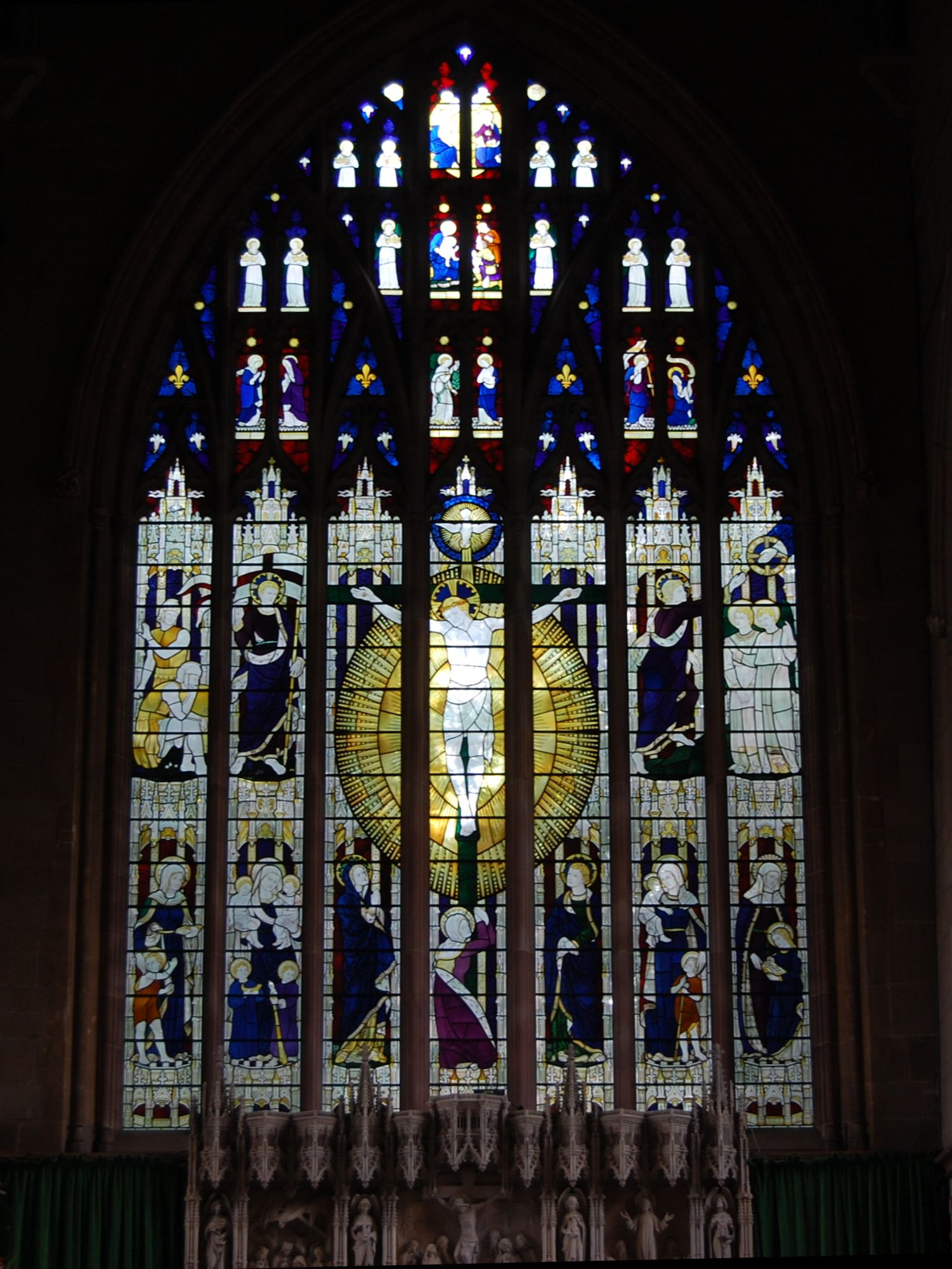
The Brides' Window. East window by Ninian Comper (1956).

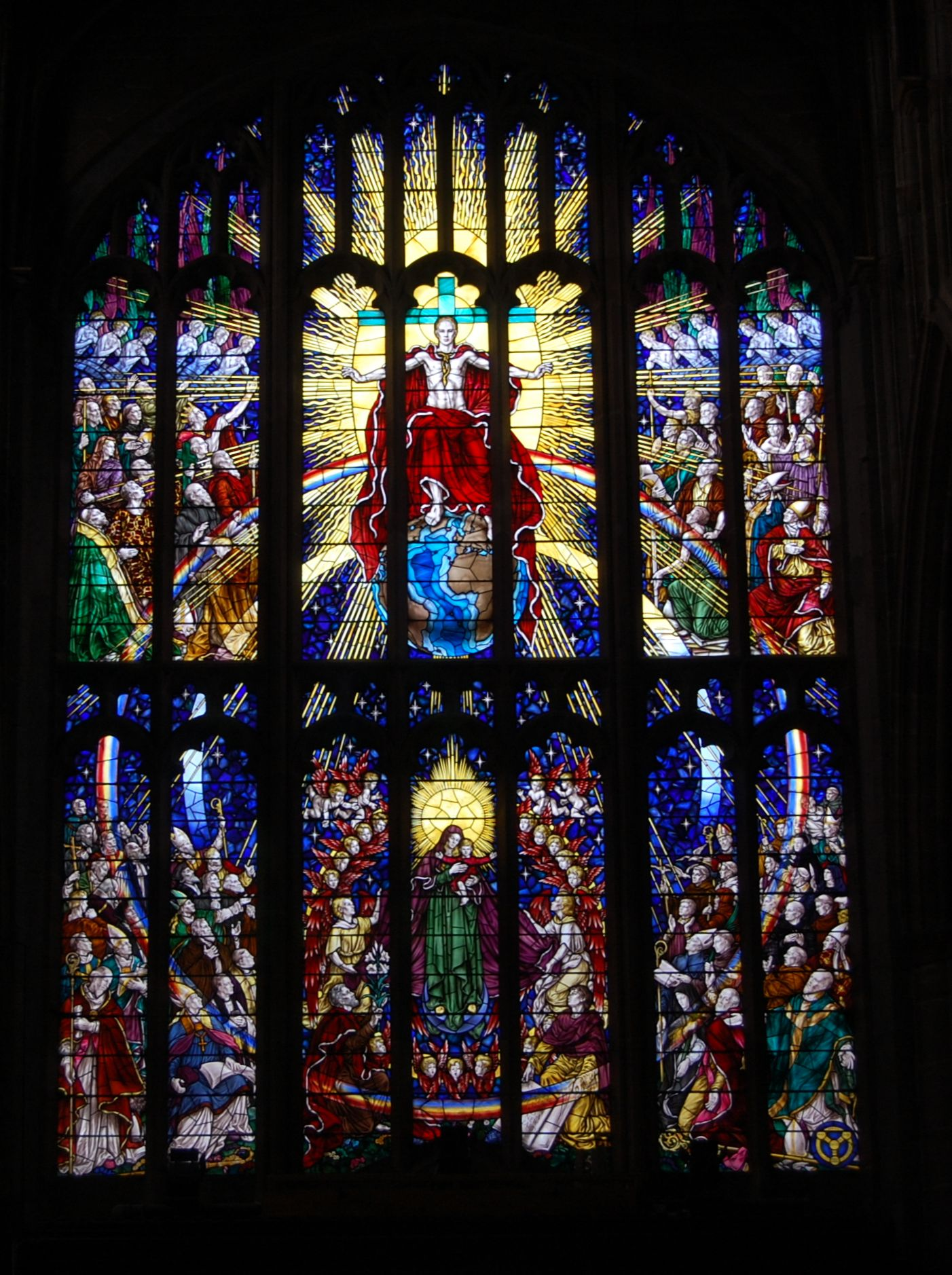
Te Deum. West window by Hugh Ray Easton (1955).

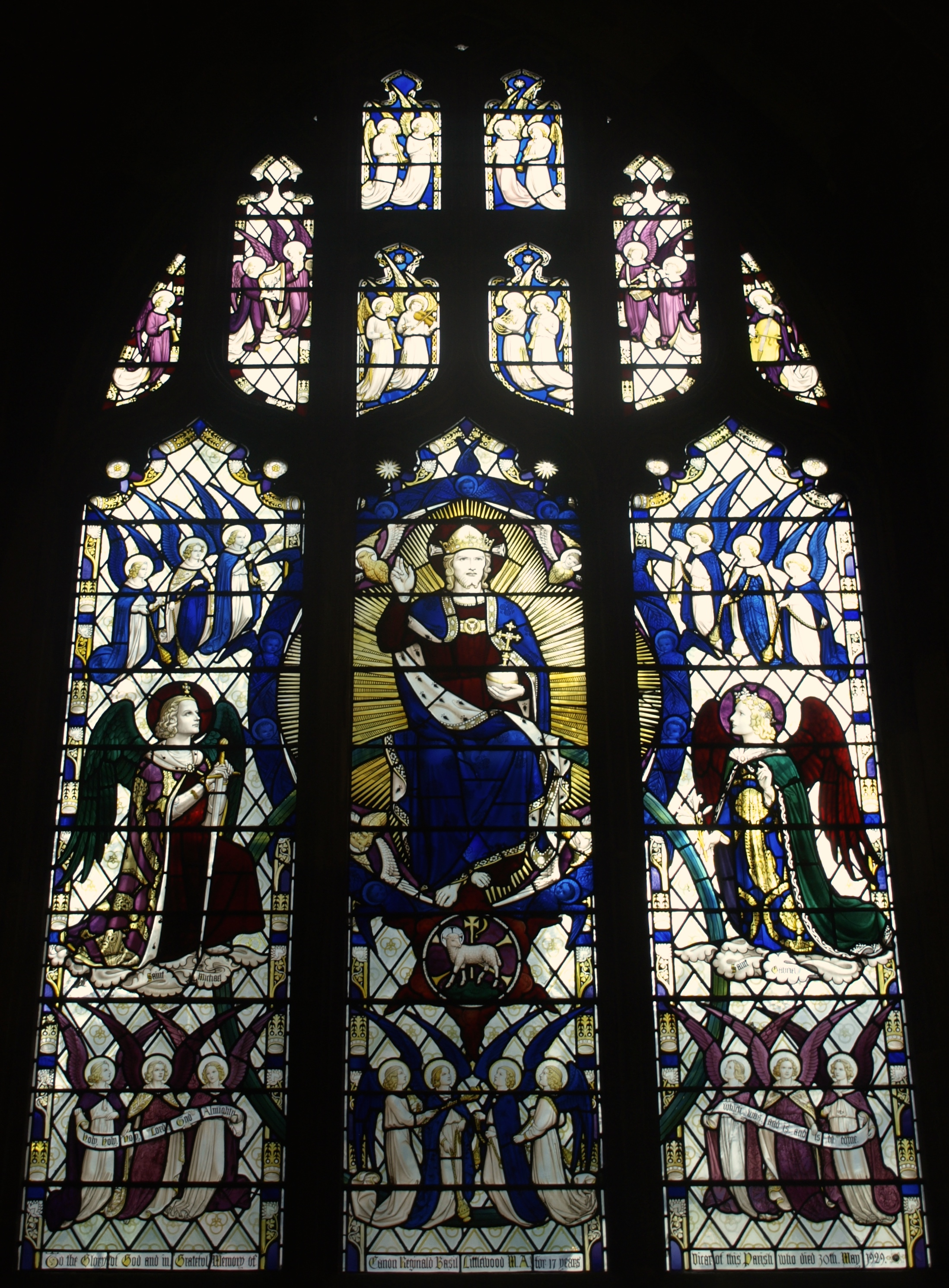
Christ in Majesty. South aisle, by Geoffrey Webb (1933).

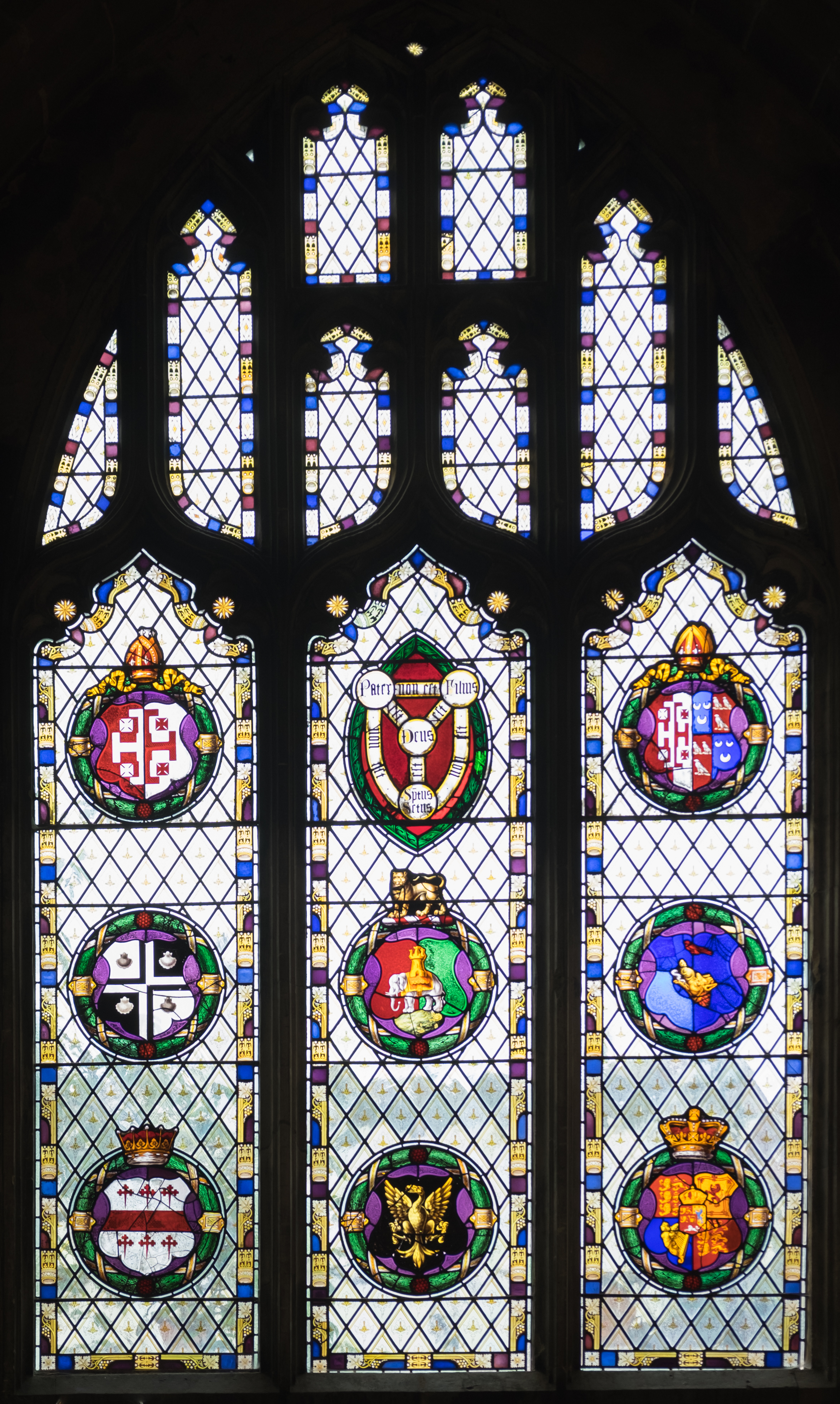
Window in the south wall

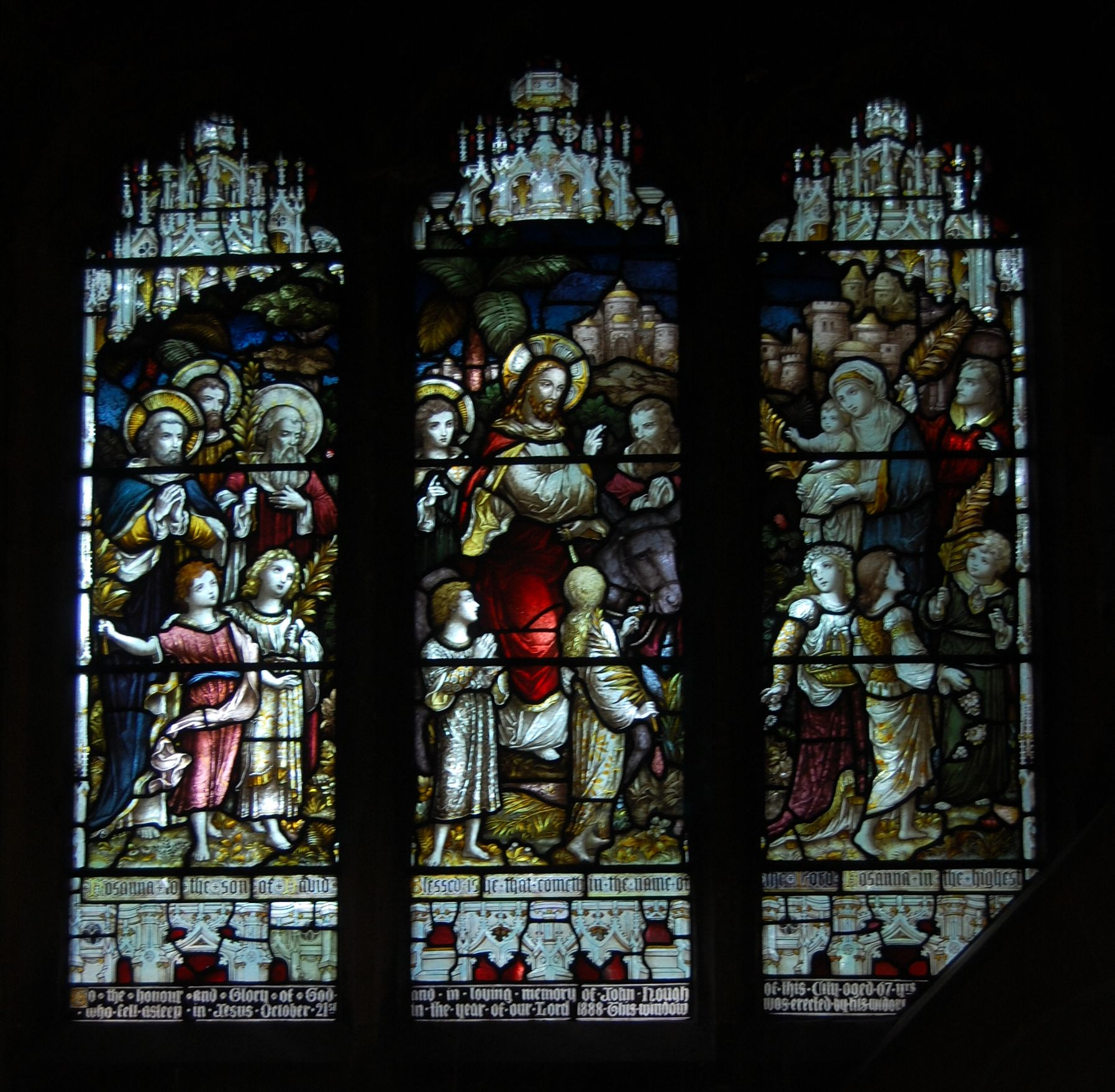
Window in the north side of the Marler Chapel

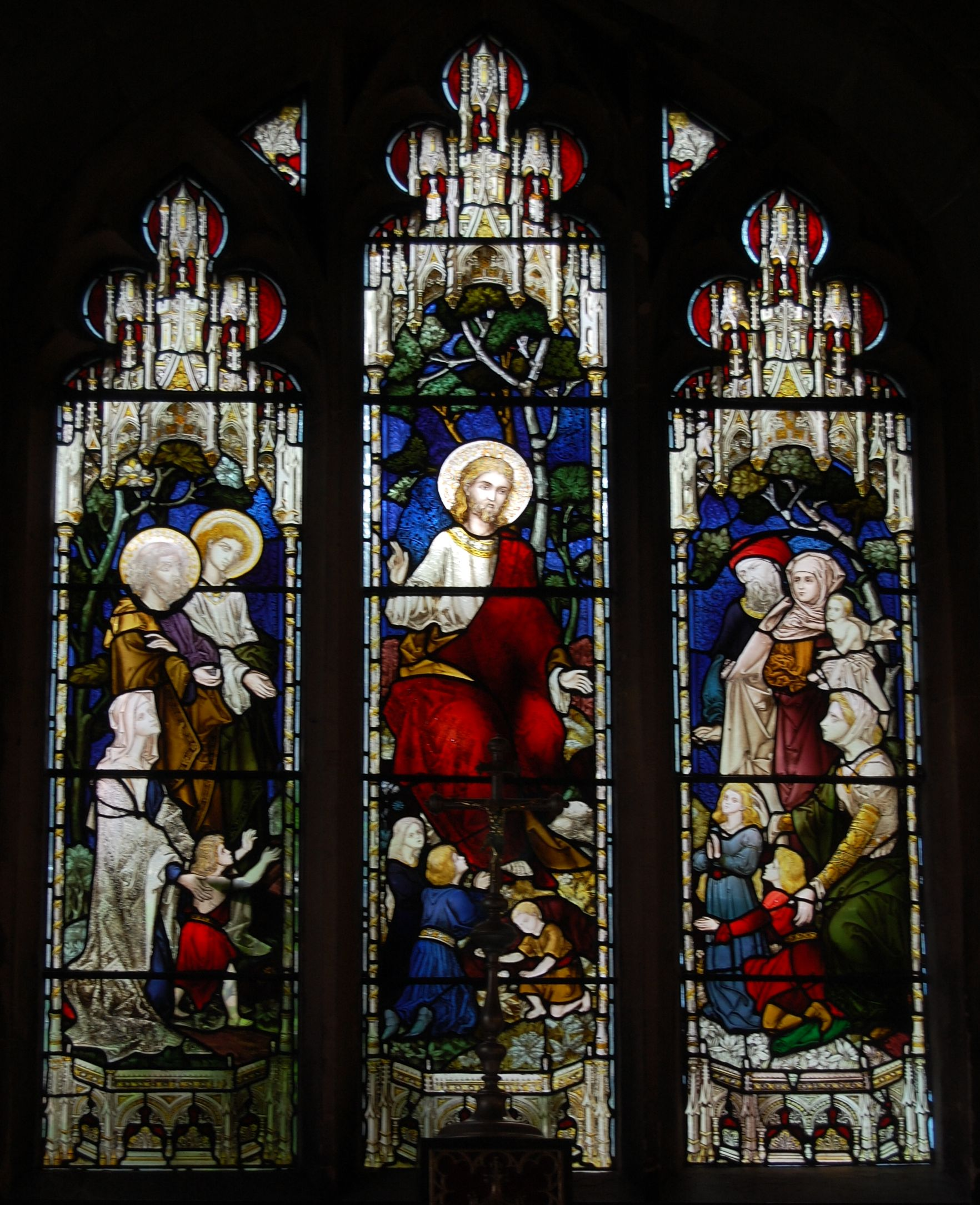
Window in the east side of the Marler Chapel

== See also ==
- Grade I listed buildings in Coventry
- The Lutterworth Doom Painting
