= Weoley Castle (house) =

Remains of a fortified manor house, in Birmingham, England

Coordinates: 52.4428°N 1.9698°W

- Birmingham, England
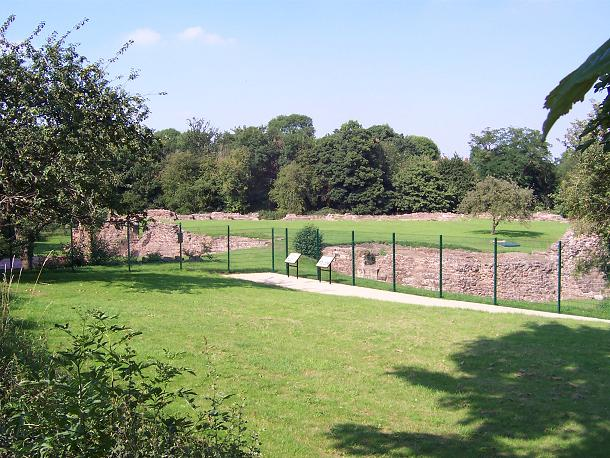

Site information
- Type: Fortified manor house
- Owner: Birmingham City Council
- Open to the public: Partially

Scheduled monument
- Official name: Weoley Castle
- Reference no.: 1005905

Listed Building – Grade II
- Official name: Remains of Weoley Castle
- Designated: 25 April 1952
- Reference no.: 1075769
- Condition: Ruined

Location
- Location in West Midlands
- Location within West Midlands county

Site history
- In use: First building: c. 1000 until 1260; Second building: c. 1273 until no later than 1603

Weoley Castle, known historically as the Manor of Welegh, (UK: /ˈwili/ WEE-lee) is the remains of a fortified manor house located in the Birmingham district of Weoley Castle, a primarily residential area, in the English West Midlands. Owned by Birmingham City Council and administered as a community museum by Birmingham Museums Trust, it is a Grade II listed building and a Scheduled monument.

== History ==
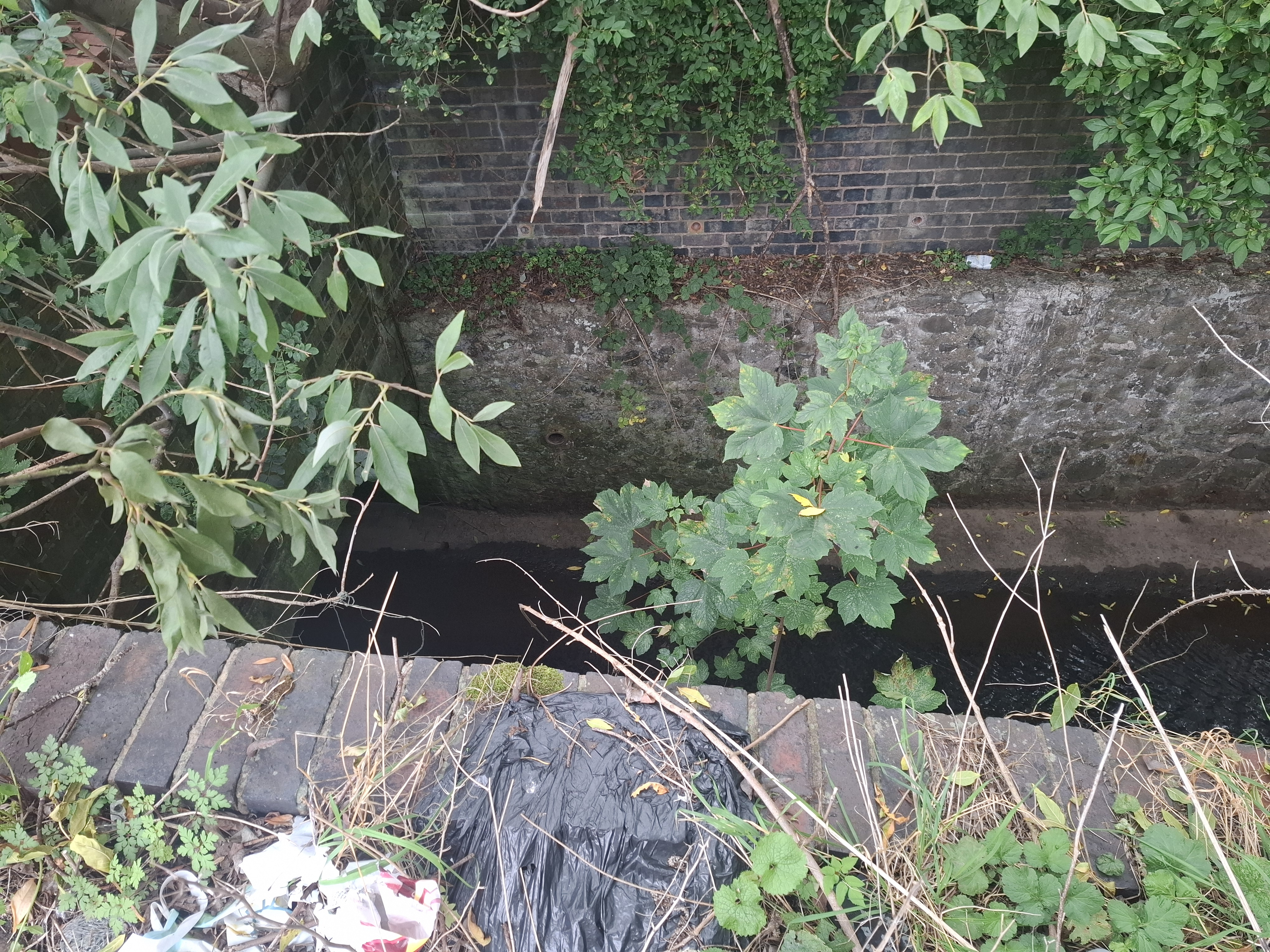
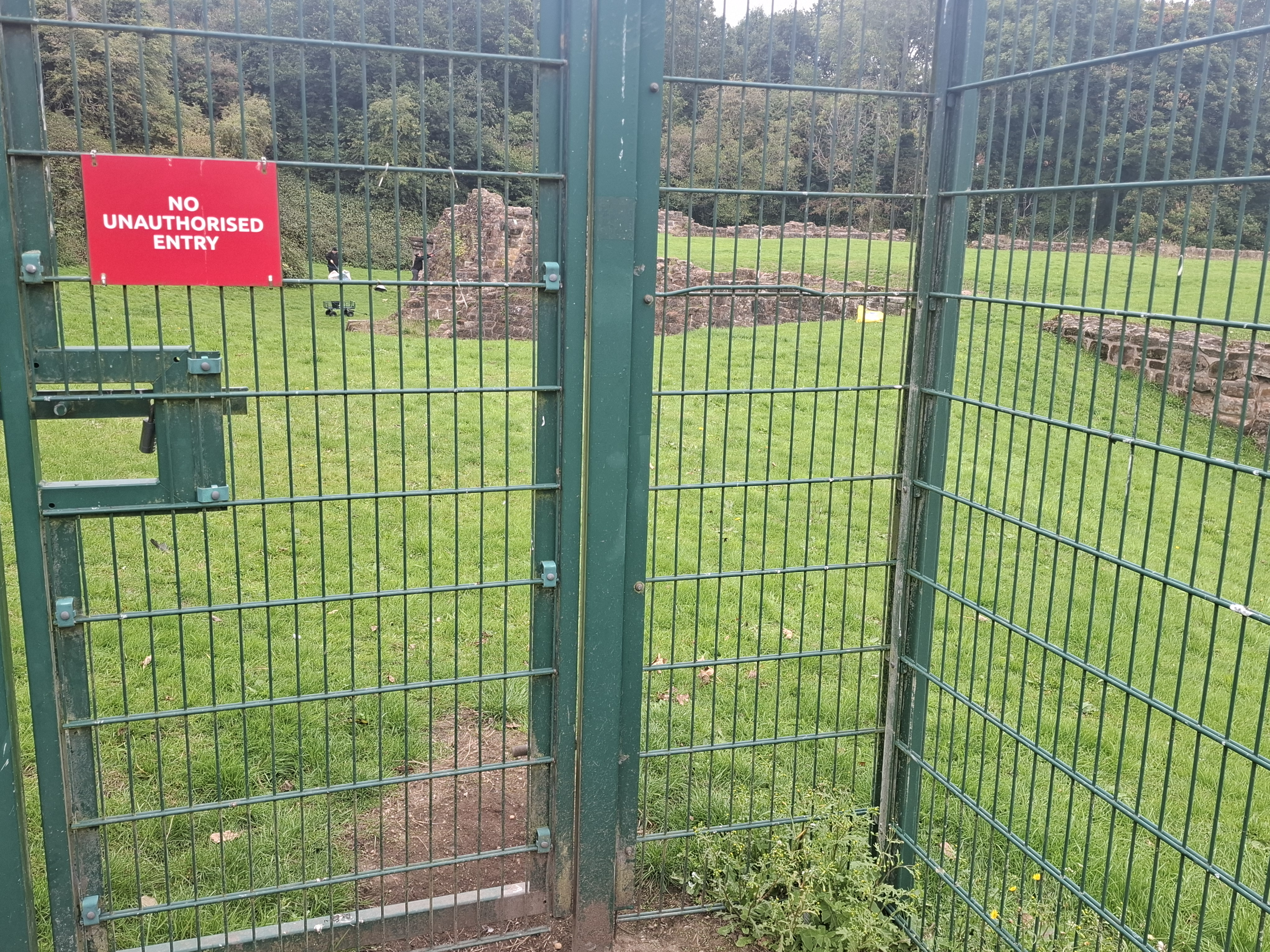
The Southern source of the Bourn Brook tributary (left) once fed the moat of Weoley Castle near the ruins (right) before the canals were constructed in 1798.

The archaeological evidence suggests on the Anglo-Saxon lands of Wulfwin at Weoley Castle, an earth platform and possibly a heathen temple existed on the site before being replaced by the first timber building on the site in c. 1000. It had hearths by c. 1100 and the timber building existed until around 1200 when it burnt down and was rebuilt with a moat and a stone hall which was demolished in 1260.

Roger de Somery obtained a licence on 16 March 1264 to crenellate his "Manor of Welegh" and it is believed that his construction work, including deepening the moat and expanding the building, was completed during the 1270s, possibly by 1273 when the surrounding deer park was described as "well stocked". de Somery used an early form of both vertical and horizontal weatherboarding during the construction of the buildings. His sister Joan de Somery inherited the Weoley Castle estate when John died in 1322.

All the remaining timber buildings were demolished by 1380 and these buildings were rebuilt using stone. After a dispute between dispute between Maurice Berkeley and Lady Bergavenny on 16 August 1424, Weoley Castle was surveyed and a plan of the building was created. The outline and plan of Weoley Castle was also last changed in c. 1424.

William Berkeley owned Weoley Castle in 1485 but King Henry VII gave the estate to Jasper Tudor in 1486, who sold it to John, Lord Dudley after ten days. The King confirmed the Dudley ownership of the building by 1495 and he regained control of the estate in 1501 before it was given to Richard Berkeley. Richard Jervoise then purchased the estate around 1531 and rented it to John Churchman.

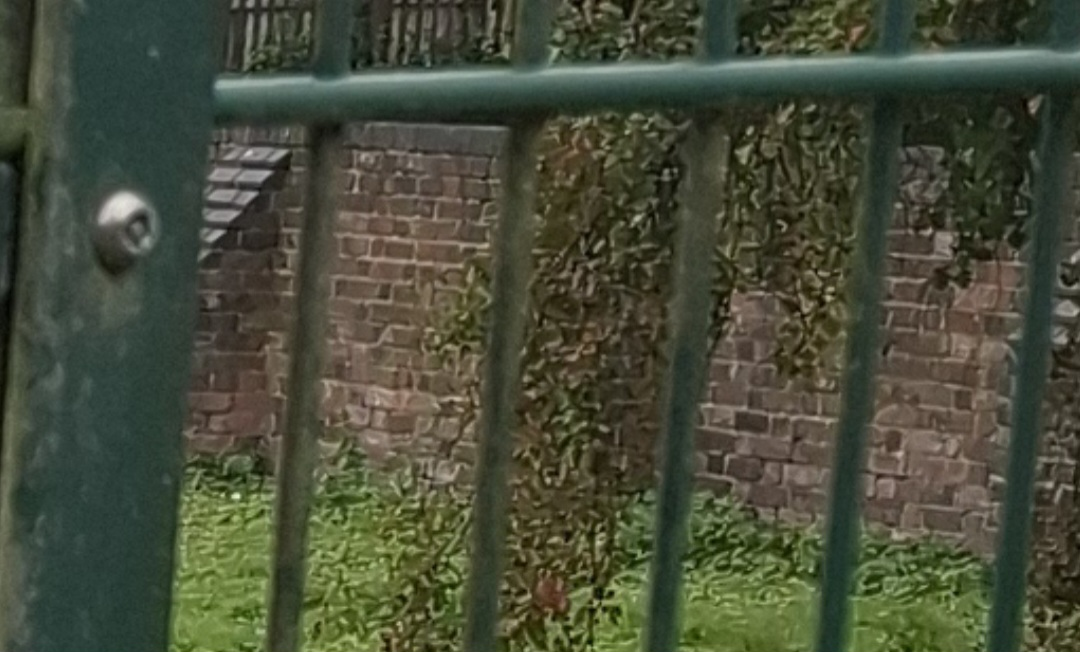
The surviving wall of the 17th century farmhouse

Weoley Castle was abandoned by the Jervoise family no later than 1603 and by 1631, Weoley Castle was noted as a 'ruyned castell' (ruined castle). Also around the same time a farmhouse was built where the education room is now and Thomas Jervoise retired to this farm house until he died in October 1654. The brick wall along the right hand arm of the moat and a few apple trees are all that now remain of the farm. During the 18th century the Dudley Canal was dug along the northern boundary and the spoil was dumped in the moat. Stone from the ruin was used in the construction of canal bridges starting in 1798.

Daniel Ledsam purchased the ruins, which were largely in a similar state as to today, in c. 1809 and they were then owned by his nephew Joseph Ledsam, a local businessman and deputy chairman of the London and North Western Railway. James Coddington Ledsam was the last private owner of Weoley Castle and he sold the estate to the City of Birmingham in 1929. An estate of the same name was built on the site of the former deer park between 1929 and 1933–34, and the ruins were listed as a Scheduled Ancient Monument in 1934 and Grade II listed on 25 April 1952.

The castle was on Historic England's Heritage at Risk Register, but was removed in 2009 following repair work.

== Excavations ==
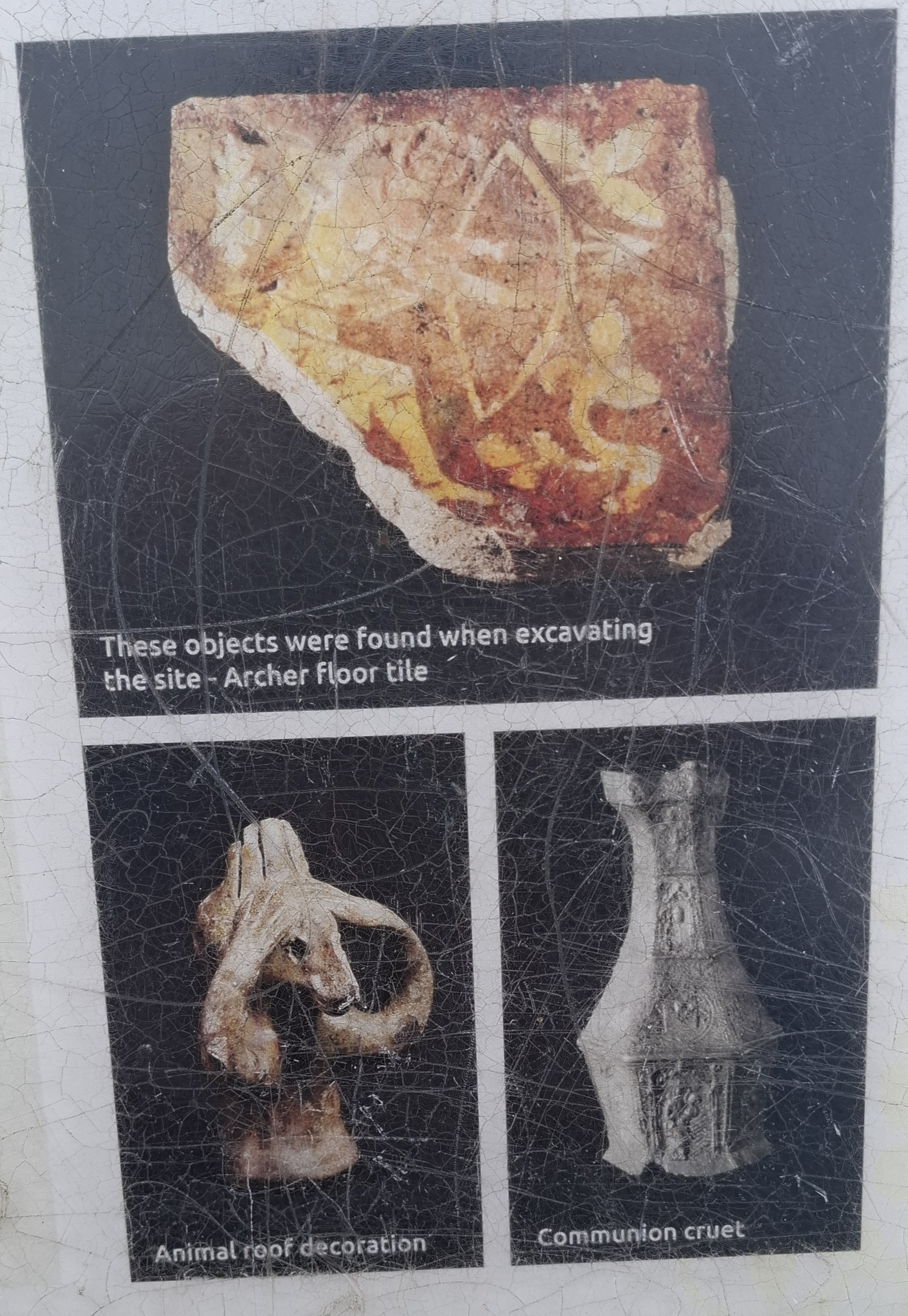
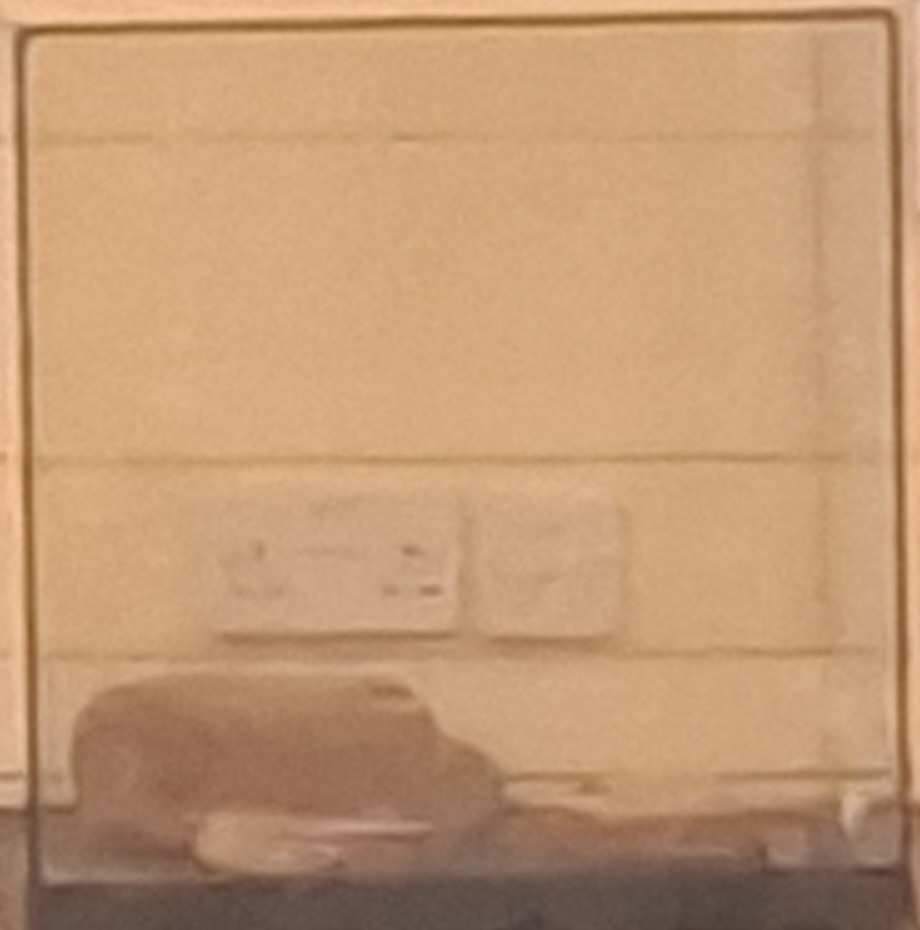
Artefacts recovered from excavations at Weoley Castle; pottery fragments (bottom). The archer tile, animal decoration, and pottery fragments date to the 14th century while the communion cruet dates to around 1235.

G. M. Bark excavated Weoley Castle in 1932 and he notably uncovered the remains of the altar and excavated the curtain wall. It was then excavated by Adrian Oswald between 1955 and 1962 and these excavations uncovered the outlines of all the stone buildings.

Coins from the site range in age from 1210 until 1483 and pottery and glassware from across Europe was also excavated from the site among other artefacts such as a 14th century chess piece and glass and floor tiles from the chapel.

== Description ==
Between 1200 and 1260, Weoley Castle was a large timber and later stone hall surrounded by a ditch. A kitchen was added towards the south of the building.

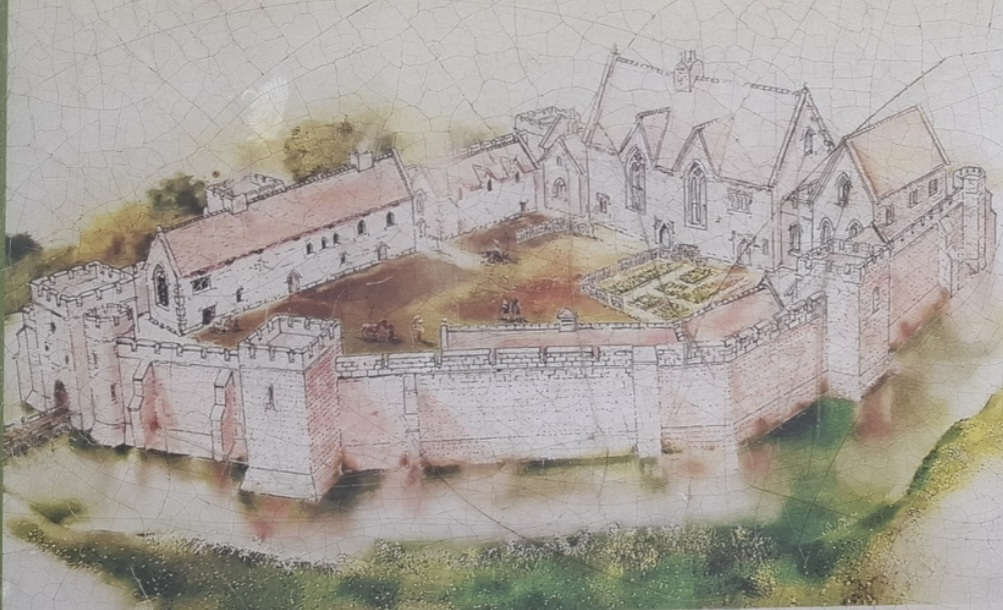
Artists depiction of Weoley Castle as it looked in 1424

Weoley Castle in 1424 would have been surrounded by a large curtain wall and a moat; the moat was originally fed by the Southern source of the Bourn Brook tributary which today runs nearby to Weoley Castle. It had a similar layout to many other manor houses of the time, with buildings such as a great hall, kitchen and a chapel being present.

Weoley Castle in 1631 was described as being in ruins, and today, only the foundations of the building survive and the moat has since been drained. The foundations of the wooden kitchen demolished in 1260 also survive today due to waterlogging.
