= William Chater =

William Chater (19 September 1821 – 7 March 1880) was an organist, composer, conductor and teacher from Coventry.

== Life ==
Chater was born in Coventry, the son of Edward and Ann Chater. He was the conductor of the Coventry Choral Society for many years.

== Appointments ==
- Organist of Vicar Lane Chapel, Coventry
- Organist of St John the Baptist Church, Coventry
- Organist of Christ Church, Coventry ???? - 1866
- Organist at Holy Trinity Church, Coventry 1866 - 1880

== Works ==
Chater wrote songs, chants, chorales and anthems including:

- Blessed is he that remembereth the Poor. Anthem.
- By the Waters of Babylon. Anthem.
