= Edward Simms =

British composer and organist

Edward Simms (10 February 1800 - 15 January 1893) was an English organist and composer.

== Background ==
He was the son of Edward Simms and born at Oldswinford, Worcestershire. He studied organ from an early age with his uncles at Stourbridge, and when ten assisted his uncle James Simms at Bromsgrove Parish Church. He went to London in 1810, and studied under Thomas Adams, and Friedrich Kalkbrenner.

In Coventry he established the Coventry Choral Society around 1836. He had many pupils of distinction, including the novelist George Eliot, and it is to him that reference is made in Middlemarch, as the teacher of Rosamond Vincy. He composed numerous pieces, but published very little.

He died in Coventry on 15 January 1893.

== Appointments ==
- Organist of Wombourne Parish Church, Wolverhampton 1813
- Organist of Holy Trinity Church, Coventry 1821–1822
- Organist in Birmingham 1822 – 1825
- Organist of St John the Baptist Church, Coventry 1825 – 1828
- Organist of St. Michael’s Church, Coventry 1828 - 1886

== Compositions ==
He composed numerous pieces, but not many were published.
