= St Mary Magdalene Church, Stockbury =

Coordinates: 51.324198°N 0.649236°E

St Mary Magdalene Church
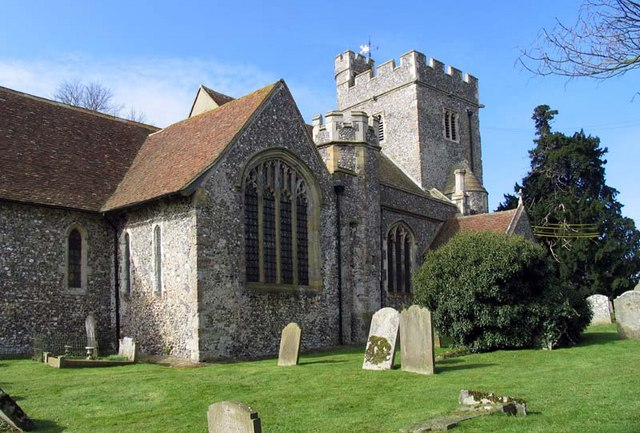

- Location within Kent
- OS grid reference: TQ 84685 61676
- Location: Stockbury, Kent
- Country: England
- Denomination: Anglican
- Website: church website

History
- Status: Parish church

Architecture
- Functional status: Active
- Heritage designation: Grade I
- Designated: 26 April 1968
- Style: Early Norman/ Perpendicular Gothic
- Completed: Late 12th century, 13th and 15th centuries

Specifications
- Materials: Flint

Administration
- Province: Canterbury
- Diocese: Canterbury
- Archdeaconry: Maidstone
- Parish: St Mary Magdalene, Stockbury

St Mary Magdalene is a parish church in Stockbury, Kent built in the late 12th century with additions in the 13th and 15th centuries and restoration in the 19th century. It is a Grade I listed building.

Construction of the church was begun around 1200 with the chancel and the north aisle surviving from this period. It is constructed of flint with stone dressings. The roofs are of plain tiles. The nave and south aisle were reconstructed in the 19th century by R. C. Hussey. Each aisle has a centrally placed porch, the north one in use as the vestry and the south one having been reconstructed in the 19th century.

The 15th-century west tower is attached to the nave at a slight angle. It is of two stages with a battlemented parapet with a gargoyle-punctuated string course at its base. A circular stair turret on the south-east corner of the tower rises above the tower's roof to form the church's highest point and is surmounted with a weathervane dated 1676. A smaller turret built into the wall on the north side of the tower is 19th-century. The arched west window in the tower is early perpendicular.

The north aisle features two large perpendicular windows and a battlemented rood loft stair turret. The rebuilt south aisle has rectangular and arched perpendicular windows. The north and south transepts contain paired lancet windows on their east sides, one of which in the north transept is early 13th century. The end walls of the transepts contain large perpendicular windows. The chancel has lancet windows on the north and south sides and three plain arched windows in the east end constructed in the 19th century.

Internally, the nave is divided from the aisles on each side with an arcade of four bays mostly reconstructed in the 19th century. The chancel is also arcaded on each side with for arches, the two western ones on each side giving access to the transepts. The nave and the south transept roofs are built with moulded crown posts. The rest of the roof has plain ceilings.

The font has an ogee-shaped wooden cover and the south wall of the chancel contains a piscina. Two monumental brasses are set into the chancel floor dedicated to John and Dorothy Hooper (d. 1617 and 1648).

The churchyard contains a war memorial and a number of Grade II listed headstones and a Grade II listed tomb. Adjacent to the church yard on the south side are the earthwork remains of a Norman ringwork fortification, a scheduled monument.

== See also ==
- Grade I listed buildings in Maidstone
