= David Gee (artist) =

British painter (1793–1872)

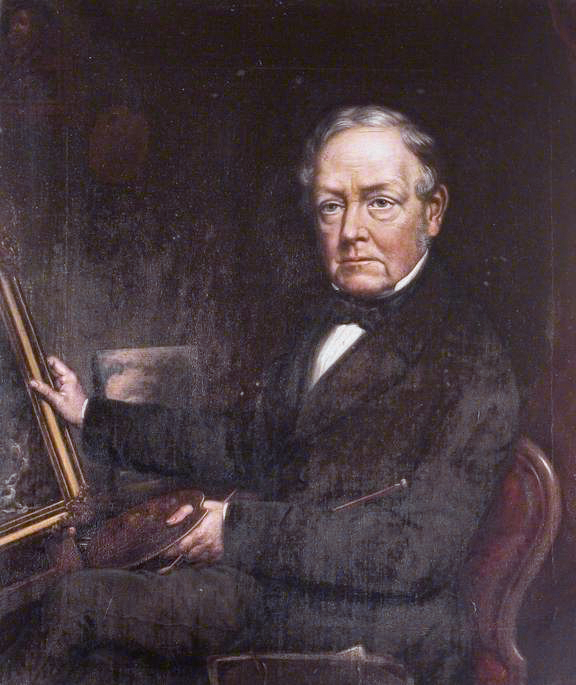
- Self portrait (c. 1868)
- Born: 1793; Coventry, England
- Died: 1872 (aged 78–79)
- Style: oil painter

David Gee (1793 – 1872) was an English oil painter who took his inspiration from the local area of Coventry.

== Biography ==
Gee was born in Coventry, and his father was a Spon Street watchmaker.

Gee was active as a painter between the years of 1815 and 1868. He mostly painted battle scenes, landscapes and portraits, as well as pictures inspired by local Coventry legends such as Lady Godiva.

Gee died in 1871 or 1872.

== Doom painting ==
In 1831, Gee began restoration work on the Holy Trinity Doom, an early 15th-century painting of the Last Judgment. He received five guineas for his work. There is little contemporary information about Gee's work on the Doom, but conservation work begun in 1995 suggests that he added outlines to the figures and repainted or recoloured some areas. There is no evidence that Gee significantly changed the painting's composition or symbolism. Gee also applied a coating of megilp to the painting. This bituminous varnish soon degraded and by 1873 the Doom was "almost invisible."

== Works ==
According to a letter dated 2 February 2015 (in response to Freedom of Information Act 2000 request ref no 20123607, link to download below), the Herbert Art Gallery and Museum in Coventry have 15 of David Gee's pictures in their collection their value ranging from £2,000 for portraits to £30,000 for his famous “Lammas Day” Coventry landscape.

One of his portraits, of Frederick George Smyth, painted in 1858, hangs in the King Henry VIII School Archive.

== Gallery ==
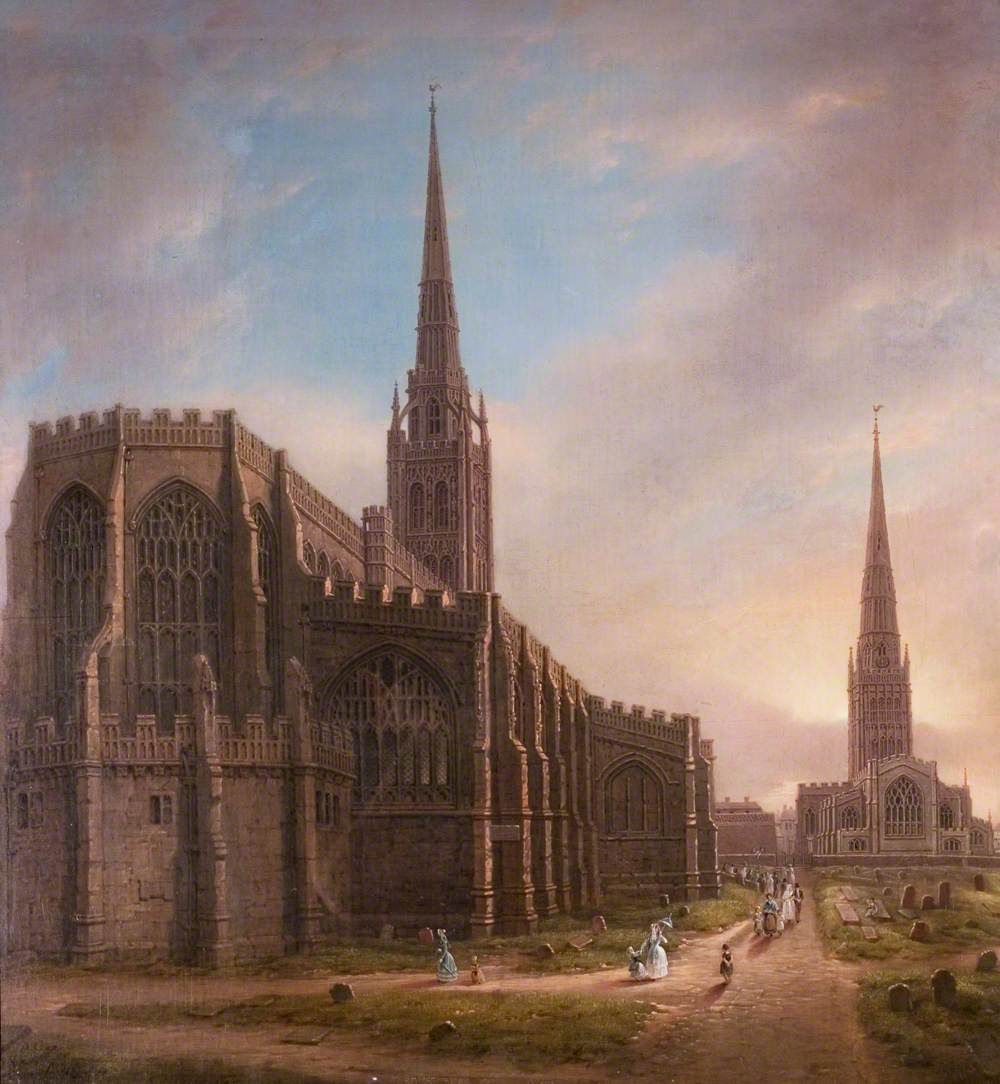
St Michael's and Holy Trinity Churches from the North East, Coventry (1849)

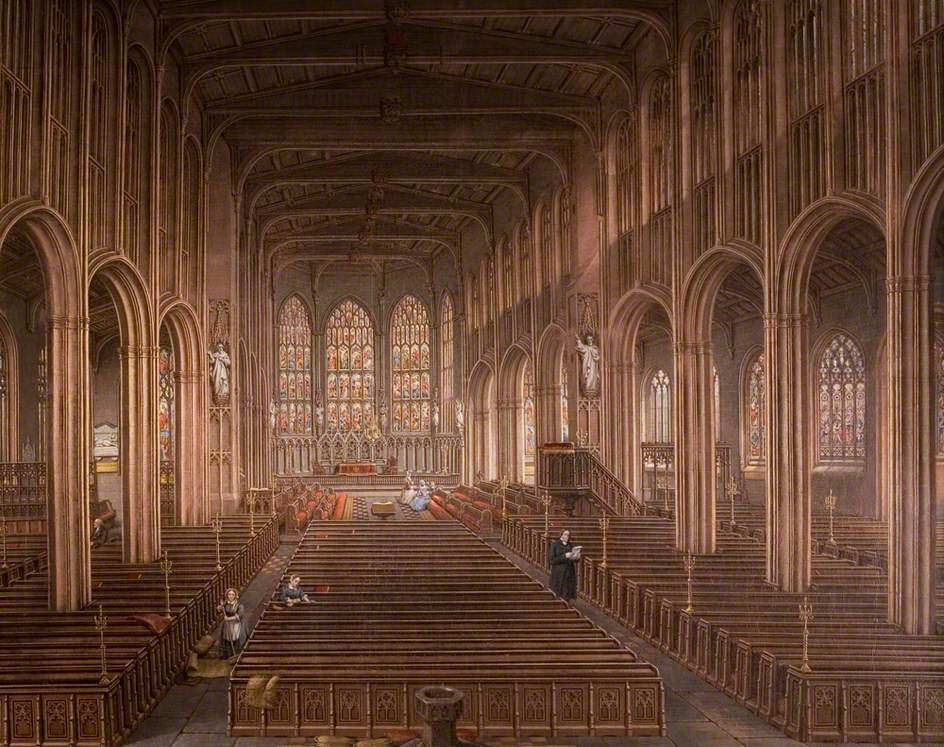
Interior of St Michael's Church, Coventry (1862)

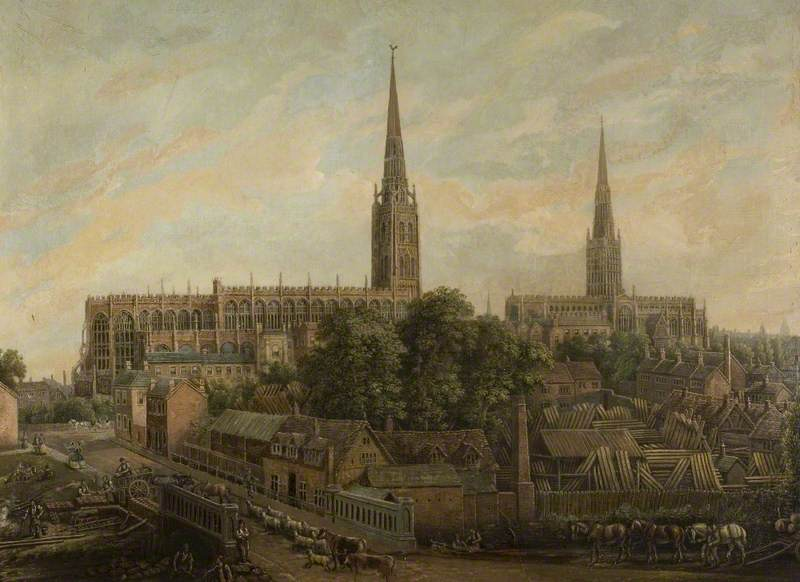
Priory Street, Coventry (1861)

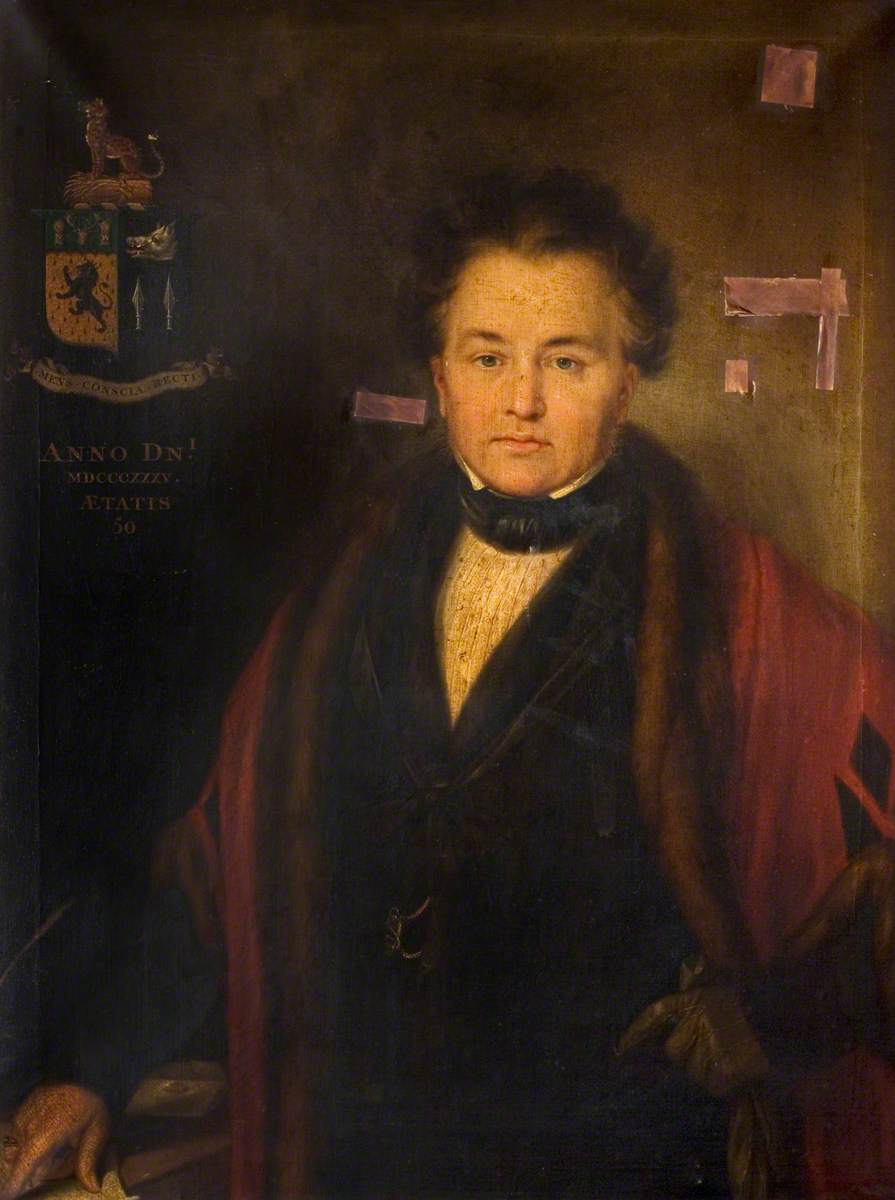
Alderman Edward Phillips (1835)

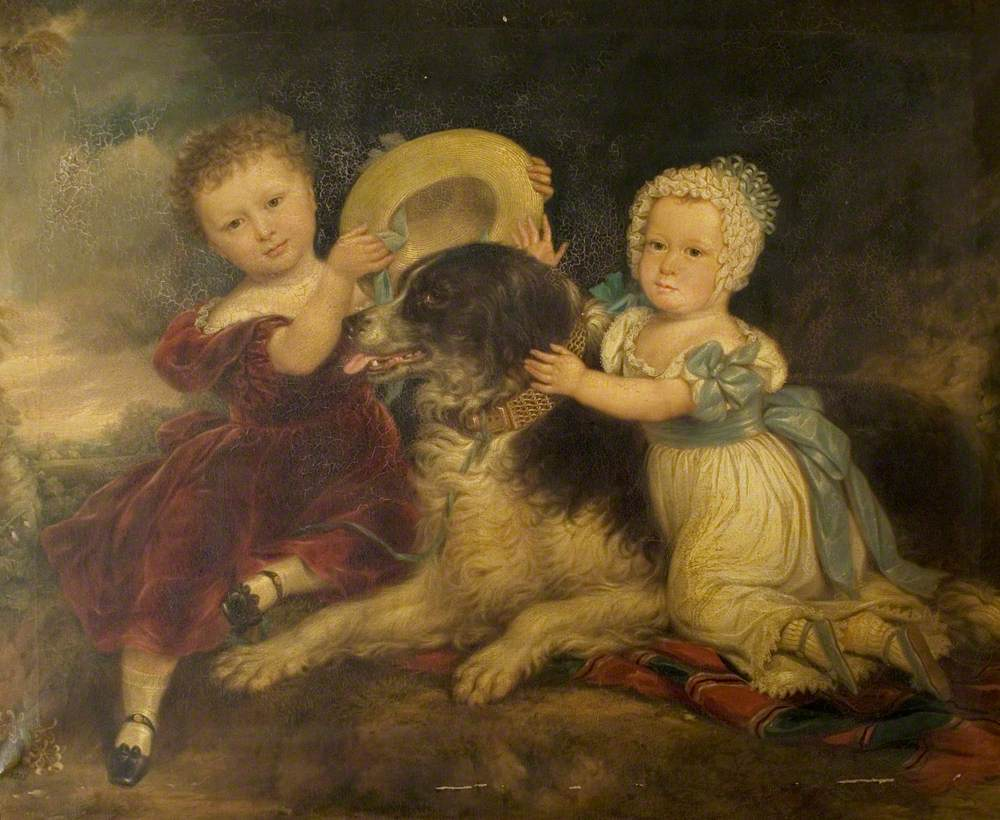
Arthur and Frances Hood, the Children of Sir Arthur Gregory of Styvechale Hall, and Nelson (1838)

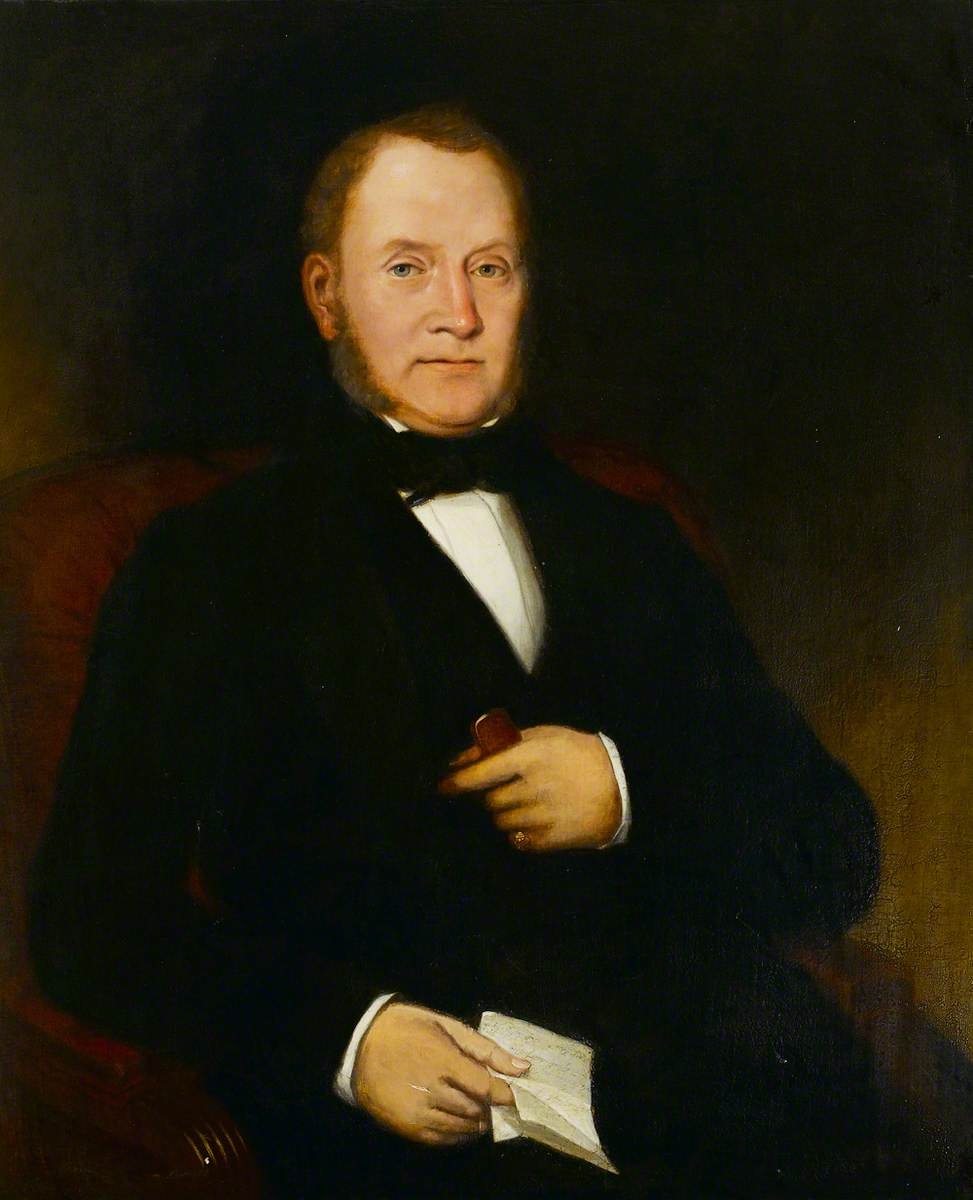
John Kevitt Rotherham (1849)

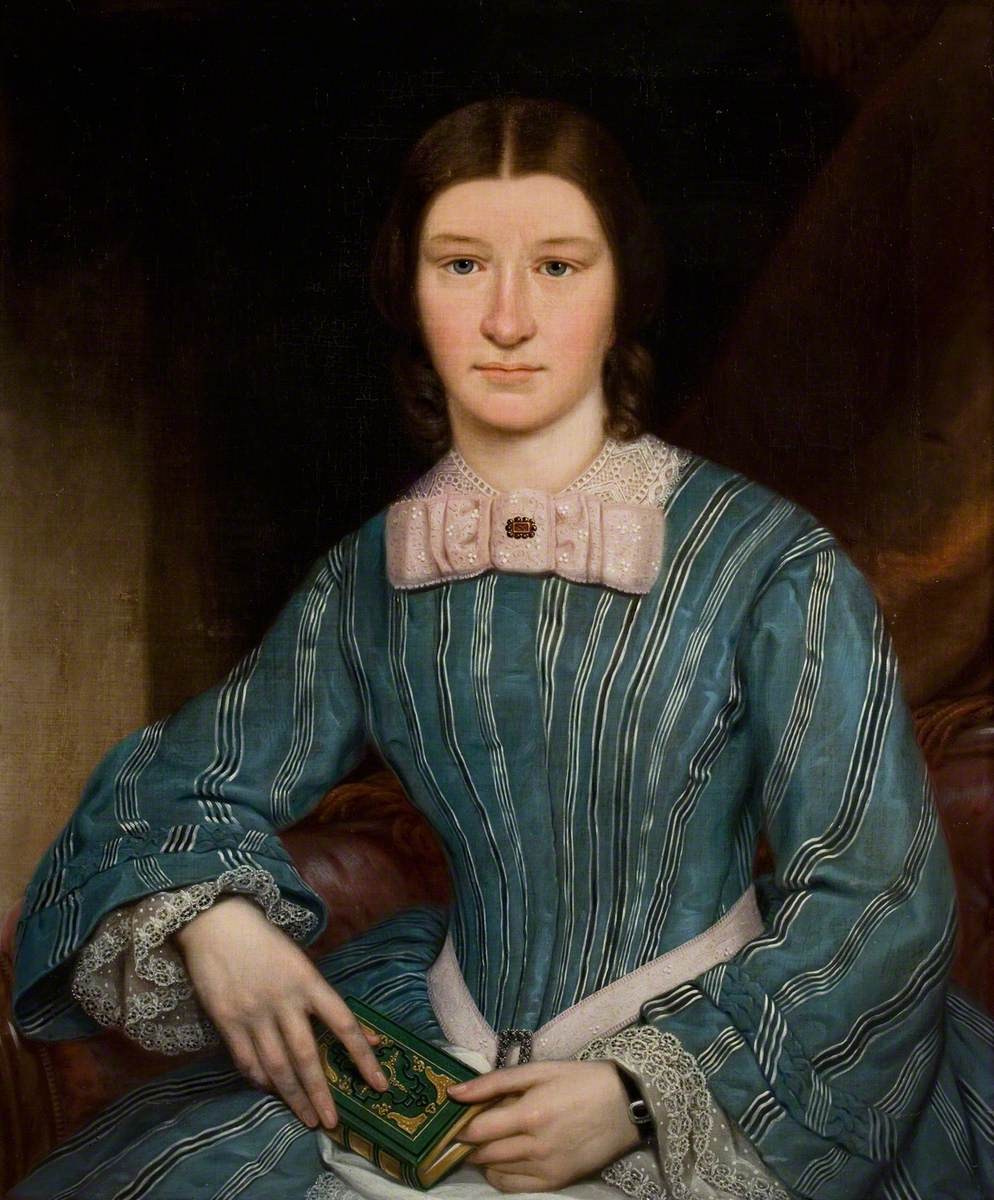
Miss Newarke (d.c.1860)

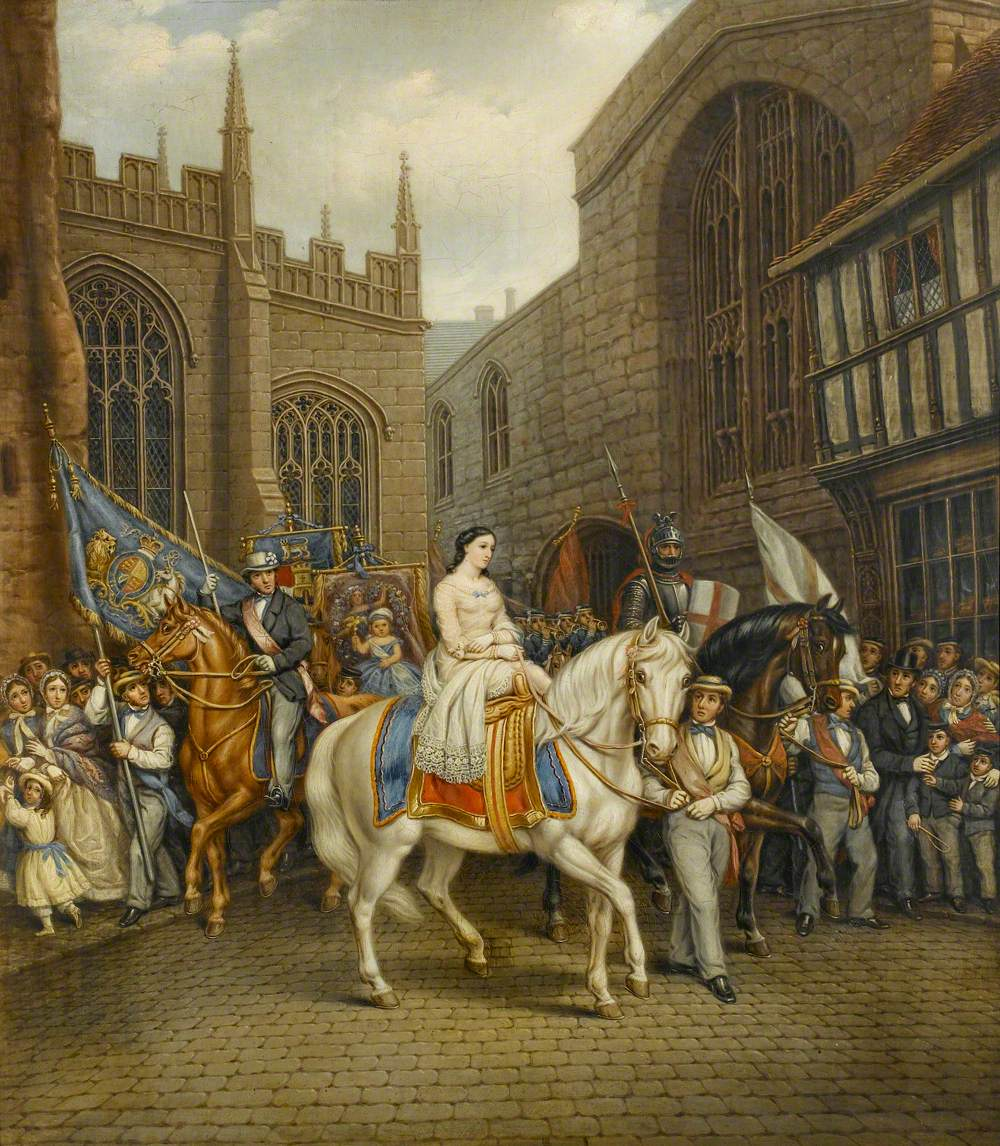
Lady Godiva Procession, Coventry (1867)

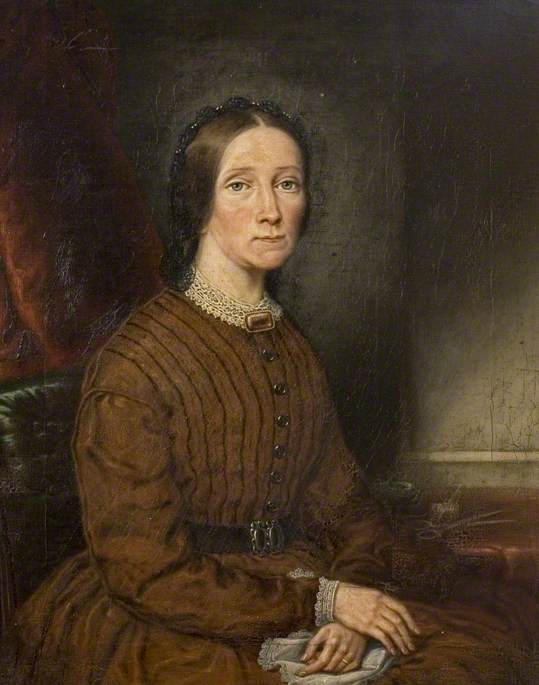
The Painter's Wife, Harriet (1809–1868), (c. 1868)
