= Harold Osmond =

British composer and organist

Harold Bartrum Osmond FRCO (19 January 1869 – 24 June 1948) was a composer and organist based in England.

== Life ==
He was born in Southampton, on 19 January 1869, the child of Arthur Osmond (1828-1895) and Matilda Bartrum (1837-1919). He studied at the Guildhall School of Music under D. Beardwell, Henry Gadsby, and other Masters. He was awarded his FRCO in 1888.

He was conductor of the Broadstairs and St. Peter's Choral Societies. Later he was conductor of the Coventry Amateur Operatic Society.

He married twice: Firstly, Florence Stuart Peat (d. 1902). Secondly, Rosa Annie Pickering. This marriage produced three children:

- Frances Noelle Osmond (1904-1965)
- Arthur Harold Osmond (1908-1996)
- Olive Mary Osmond (1909-1987)

== Appointments ==
- Organist at St Peter's Bethnal Green 1884 - 1886
- Organist at St. Barnabas' Church, Homerton 1886 - 1889
- Organist at St. Peter's Church, Thanet 1889 - 1918
- Organist at Holy Trinity Church, Coventry 1918 - ????

== Compositions ==
His chief compositions were:

- Sacred Cantata, The Ascension 1886
- Psalm 23, for baritone solo, chorus, and orchestra 1886
- Communion Service in E
- Anthems, etc.
- Symphonic Suite for small orchestra, 1896
