= Frank Frederick Cuisset =

Frank Frederick Cuisset (23 February 1812 – 1891) was a composer and organist based in Birmingham and Godalming.

== Life ==
He was born on 23 February 1812 in Holborn, Middlesex, the son of John Patrick Cuisset.

He studied music under Sir Henry Bishop, Henry Brinley Richards and Sir George Smart. An advertisement in the Birmingham Gazette of Saturday 6 October 1860 describes him as Professor of Singing, formerly of the Royal Academy of Music and St Paul's Cathedral.

He married Mary Ann Watkins, daughter of Thomas Watkins, on 19 July 1860 in St Saviour's Church, Paddington. They had one daughter, Florence Mary A Cuisset (b. 1865).

He died in 1891 in Godalming, Surrey.

== Appointments ==
- Organist at Holy Trinity Church, Coventry 1856 - 1860
- Organist at Bishop Ryder Church, Birmingham
- Organist at St Mary's Church, Selly Oak, Birmingham
- Organist at St John the Baptist Church, Busbridge, Godalming

== Compositions ==
He was the author of The Vocalist's Indispensable Practice, a series of exercises for promoting the strength and flexibility of the voice, published in London in 1875.

He was also a composer of concerted vocal music, songs, hymn tunes, etc. His tune 'Harnal' was first published in Congregational Church Music, London, 1853.
