= Listed buildings in Stockbury =

Civil Parish in Kent, England

Stockbury is a village and civil parish in the Borough of Maidstone of Kent, England It contains one grade I and 20 grade II listed buildings that are recorded in the National Heritage List for England.

This list is based on the information retrieved online from Historic England.

== Key ==
Grade	Criteria
I	Buildings that are of exceptional interest
II*	Particularly important buildings of more than special interest
II	Buildings that are of special interest

== Listing ==
Name	Grade	Location	Type	Completed (Note: The date given is the date used by Historic England as significant for the initial building or that of an important part in the structure's description.)	Date designated	Grid ref. (Note: The grid reference is based on the British national grid reference system, sometimes known as OSGB36, used by the Ordnance Survey.) Geo-coordinates	Notes	Entry number (Note: The "List Entry Number" is a unique number assigned to each listed building and scheduled monument by Historic England.)	Image	Wikidata
Beaux Aires Farmhouse	II	Binbury Lane, Beaux Aires			20 July 1984	TQ8217660728; 51°18′59″N 0°36′46″E		1186213	Upload Photo	Q26481479
Nettlestead House	II	Bull Lane			20 July 1984	TQ8424662054; 51°19′40″N 0°38′35″E		1086192	Upload Photo	Q26376147
Church Farmhouse and Church Farm Cottage	II	Church Lane			20 July 1984	TQ8457961669; 51°19′27″N 0°38′52″E		1299288	Upload Photo	Q26586701
Church of St Mary Magdalene	I	Church Lane			26 April 1968	TQ8468561676; 51°19′27″N 0°38′57″E		1086193	Church of St Mary Magdalene More images	Q7594592
Headstone to Hannah Redman Circa 8 Yards North of North Porch of Church of St Mary Magdalene	II	Church Lane			20 July 1984	TQ8469161693; 51°19′28″N 0°38′58″E		1186237	Upload Photo	Q96096904
Headstone to Reginald Bonton Circa 7 Yards North of North Aisle of Church of St Mary Magdalene	II	Church Lane			20 July 1984	TQ8469761686; 51°19′27″N 0°38′58″E		1186232	Upload Photo	Q96096906
Headstone to Thomas Gover Circa 7 Yards North West of Tower of Church of St Mary Magdalene	II	Church Lane			20 July 1984	TQ8468261692; 51°19′28″N 0°38′57″E		1086194	Upload Photo	Q96096907
Table Tomb Circa 13 Yards North of East End of North Aisle of Church of St Mary Magdalene	II	Church Lane			26 April 1968	TQ8470561685; 51°19′27″N 0°38′58″E		1336256	Upload Photo	Q96096903
Cowstead	II	Cowstead Lane			20 July 1984	TQ8408662681; 51°20′00″N 0°38′28″E		1086195	Upload Photo	Q26376152
Magpie Hall	II	Hazel Street			20 July 1984	TQ8570060587; 51°18′51″N 0°39′48″E		1086196	Upload Photo	Q26376157
Hazel Street Farmhouse	II	Hazel Street Road, Hazel Street			20 July 1984	TQ8534859417; 51°18′13″N 0°39′27″E		1336257	Upload Photo	Q26620768
Wheatsheaf Farmhouse	II	Hazel Street Road, Hazel Street			20 July 1984	TQ8521758555; 51°17′46″N 0°39′19″E		1116541	Upload Photo	Q26410141
Barn Circa 25 Yards South East of Hill Green Farmhouse	II	Hill Green Road, Hill Green			20 July 1984	TQ8316262034; 51°19′40″N 0°37′39″E		1086197	Upload Photo	Q26376161
Cart Shed Circa 20 Yards East of Hill Green Farmhouse	II	Hill Green Road, Hill Green			20 July 1984	TQ8319062068; 51°19′42″N 0°37′41″E		1116528	Upload Photo	Q26410129
Hill Green Farmhouse	II	Hill Green Road, Hill Green			26 April 1968	TQ8316962079; 51°19′42″N 0°37′40″E		1116525	Upload Photo	Q26410126
Icknor	II	Old Forge Lane, South Green			20 July 1984	TQ8433659207; 51°18′08″N 0°38′35″E		1116535	Upload Photo	Q26410136
South Green Farmhouse	II	South Green			20 July 1984	TQ8504460146; 51°18′37″N 0°39′13″E		1086198	Upload Photo	Q26376167
Barn Circa 35 Yards West of Parsonage Farmhouse	II	South Street Road			20 July 1984	TQ8387661606; 51°19′26″N 0°38′15″E		1116515	Upload Photo	Q26410116
Cherry Trees	II	South Street Road			20 July 1984	TQ8408961896; 51°19′35″N 0°38′27″E		1319937	Upload Photo	Q26605992
Little South Street Cottage	II	South Street Road, South Street			20 July 1984	TQ8372061142; 51°19′11″N 0°38′06″E		1319891	Upload Photo	Q26605949
Parsonage Farmhouse	II	South Street Road			26 April 1968	TQ8390161561; 51°19′24″N 0°38′17″E		1086199	Upload Photo	Q26376172
Springfield Street Foxes	II	South Street Road			20 July 1984	TQ8404861835; 51°19′33″N 0°38′25″E		1086200	Upload Photo	Q26376178
Steppes Hill Farmhouse	II	South Street Road, South Street			20 July 1984	TQ8334661055; 51°19′09″N 0°37′47″E		1336259	Upload Photo	Q26620770
The Old Forge	II	South Street Road			20 July 1984	TQ8413261942; 51°19′36″N 0°38′29″E		1336260	Upload Photo	Q26620771
Cherry Orchard Cottage	II	Yelsted Lane, Yelsted			20 July 1984	TQ8239562219; 51°19′47″N 0°37′00″E		1116502	Upload Photo	Q26410105
Guildstead Court	II	Yelsted Lane, Yelsted			20 July 1984	TQ8225162199; 51°19′47″N 0°36′53″E		1319943	Upload Photo	Q26605997
Yelsted Court Farmhouse	II	Yelsted Lane, Yelsted			26 April 1968	TQ8217462251; 51°19′49″N 0°36′49″E		1336261	Upload Photo	Q26620772
Beaux Aires Cottage	II	Yelsted Road, Beaux Aires			20 July 1984	TQ8228161242; 51°19′16″N 0°36′52″E		1086201	Upload Photo	Q26376183
Beaux Aires House	II	Yelsted Road, Beaux Aires			20 July 1984	TQ8220661040; 51°19′09″N 0°36′48″E		1116489	Upload Photo	Q26410092
Penny Cottage	II	Yelsted Road, Yelsted			20 July 1984	TQ8242162243; 51°19′48″N 0°37′01″E		1086202	Upload Photo	Q26376190

== See also ==
- Grade I listed buildings in Kent
- Grade II* listed buildings in Kent

== Sources ==
- Newman, John (2012) [1969], Kent: West and the Weald, The Buildings of England, New Haven and London: Yale University Press, ISBN 978-0-300-18509-6
