= St Mary's Church, Selly Oak =

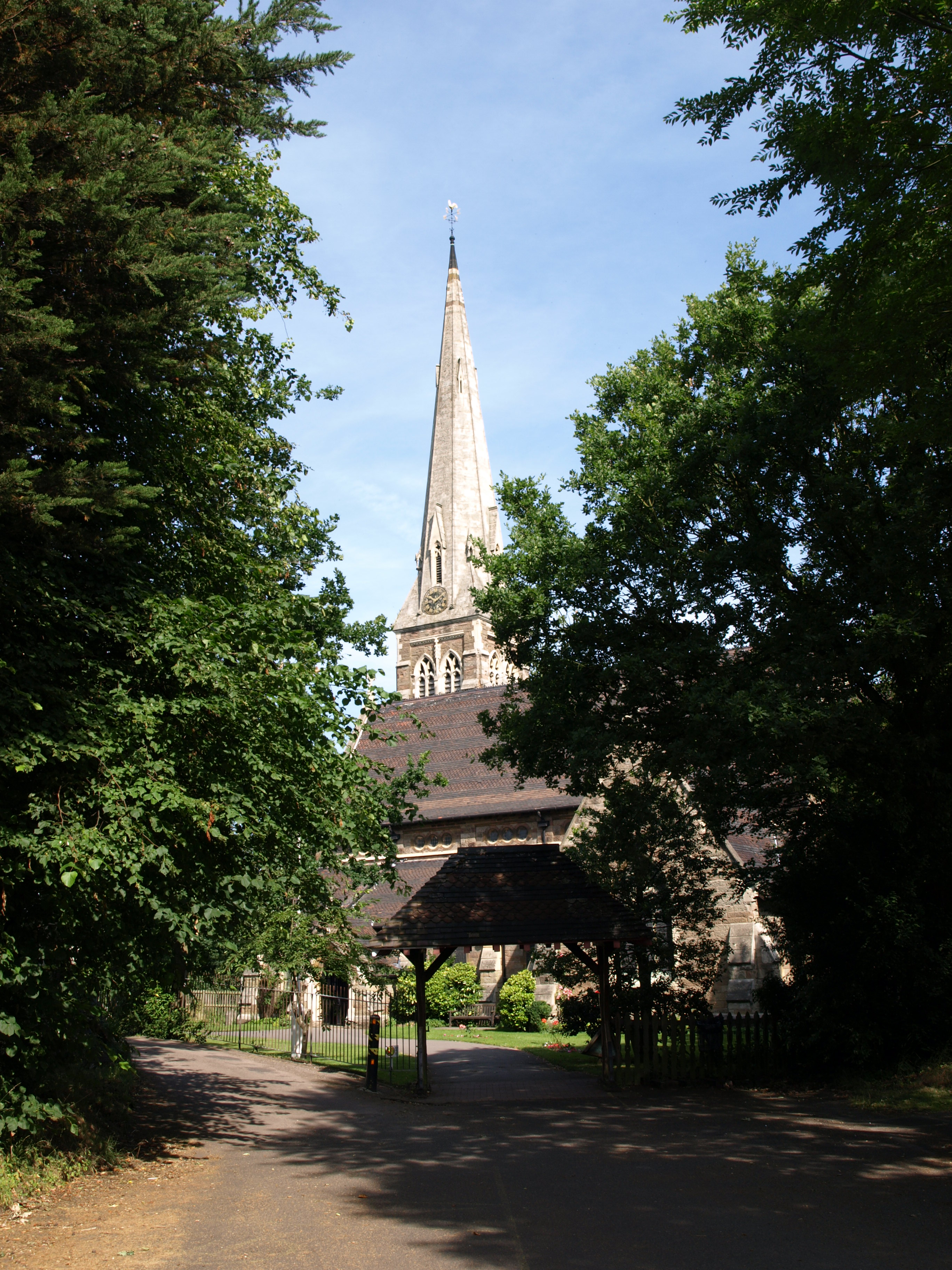
- St Mary's from the south

- Location within the West Midlands
- 52.4381°N 1.9457°W
- OS grid reference: SP 03787 82229
- Location: Selly Oak, Birmingham
- Country: England
- Denomination: Church of England
- Churchmanship: Broad Church / Central
- Website: Church website

History
- Dedication: Saint Mary
- Consecrated: 12 September 1861

Architecture
- Heritage designation: Grade II listed
- Designated: 8 July 1982
- Architect: Edward Holmes
- Style: Gothic Revival
- Groundbreaking: 12 July 1860

Specifications
- Capacity: 617 persons
- Length: 102.5 feet (31.2 m)
- Materials: sandstone; limestone

Administration
- Province: Canterbury
- Diocese: Birmingham
- Archdeaconry: Birmingham
- Deanery: Edgbaston
- Parish: Selly Oak

Clergy
- Vicar: Rev. Hazel White

St. Mary's Church, Selly Oak is a Church of England parish church in Selly Oak, Birmingham, England.

== History ==
The parish of St. Mary was from part of the parish of St. Laurence, Northfield in 1862.

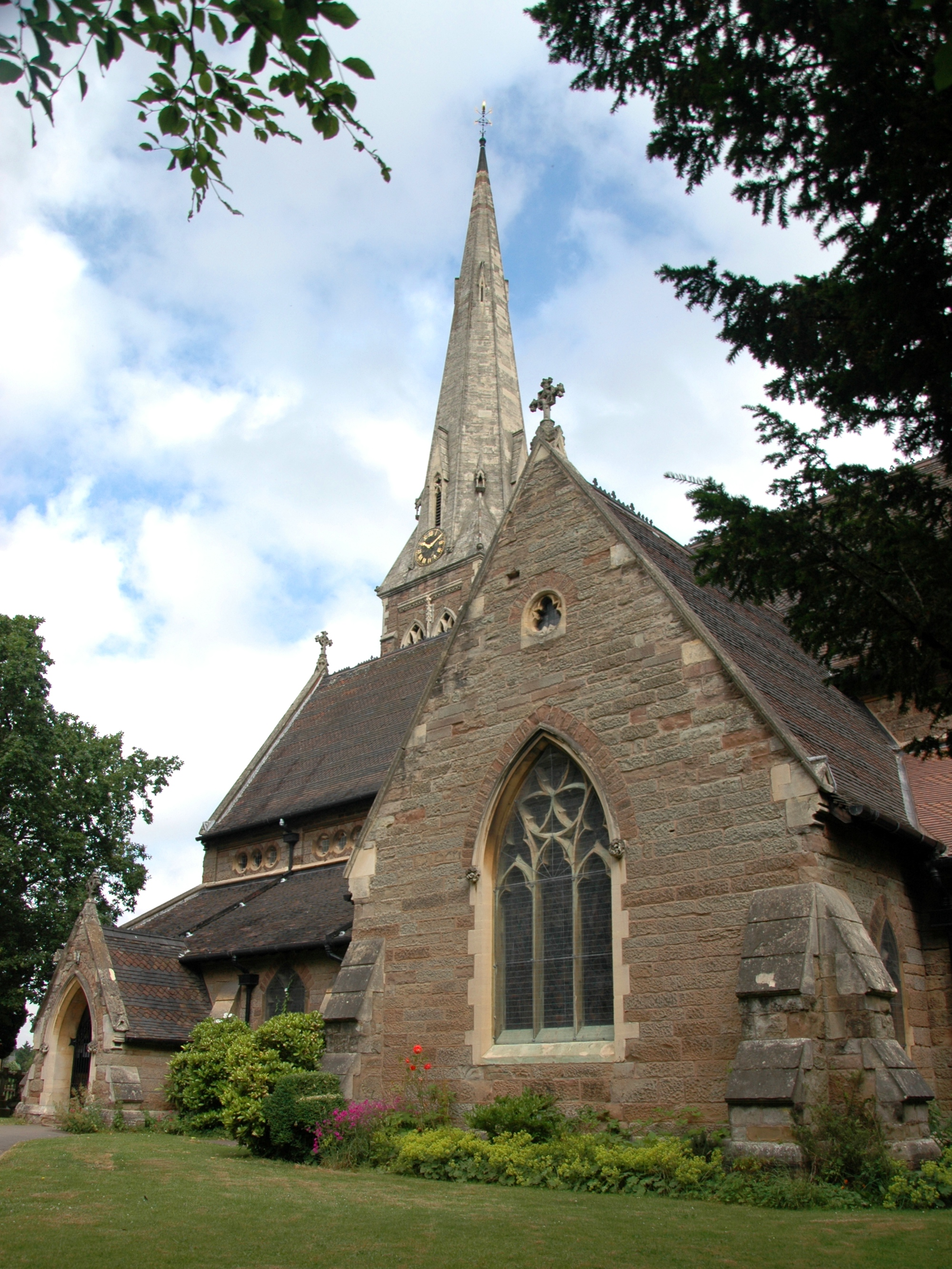
St Mary's from the southeast, showing the south transept

The church is set back from the main Bristol Road (A38 road) and is approached from the south by a drive, ending at a lychgate at the entrance to the churchyard. There is also an entrance from the north in Lodge Hill Road.

St Mary's foundation stone was laid on 12 July 1860 by Joseph Frederick Ledsam, and the Bishop of Worcester, the Right Reverend Henry Philpott, consecrated the church on 12 September 1861. The church was funded by the manufacturer George Richards Elkington (1801–65) and by Joseph Frederick Ledsam (1791–1862).

The architect Edward Holmes designed the building in a Gothic Revival interpretation of Decorated Gothic. It is built of coursed sandstone, laid in courses of two different shades. The walls are of brick, faced externally with Bromsgrove stone, with Bath stone used for the tracery, dressings and spire. The nave, chancel and aisle arches and columns are executed in Bath stone, the arches having Weoley Castle stone voussoirs introduced alternately with Bath stone. Bands of Weoley Castle stone run horizontally around the inside of the church. The chancel roof was decorated with flowers in gold and colours, painted on a blue ground between the rafters. The north-west tower has a broach spire 150 feet (46 m) high, topped by a weathercock.

The church is cruciform, and the nave has a clerestory and north and south aisles with four-bay arcades. The clerestory windows are quatrefoils set in groups of three. Internally the walls are plastered, and the plastering is punctuated by horizontal bands of sandstone. In the transepts and nave the roof timbers are exposed and in the chancel they are gilded and painted in heraldic colours of red, blue, green, white and gold.

The parish of St Stephen, Selly Park was formed from part of St. Mary's parish in 1871. The parishes were in the Anglican Diocese of Worcester until 1905, when they became part of the newly created Anglican Diocese of Birmingham. In 1893 a mission church was established and in 1906 a new church of St Wulstan's Church, Selly Oak was built. A parish was formed out of St Mary's for this new church in 1911.

For St Mary's centenary in 1961 the interior was reordered and redecorated under the direction of the architect Stephen Dykes Bower. At the same time painted, sculpted rood was removed from the chancel arch and transferred to Holy Trinity parish church, Hadley, Shropshire.

Since 1982 the building has been Grade II listed In the 1980s a set of olive wood Stations of the Cross was installed.

== Windows ==
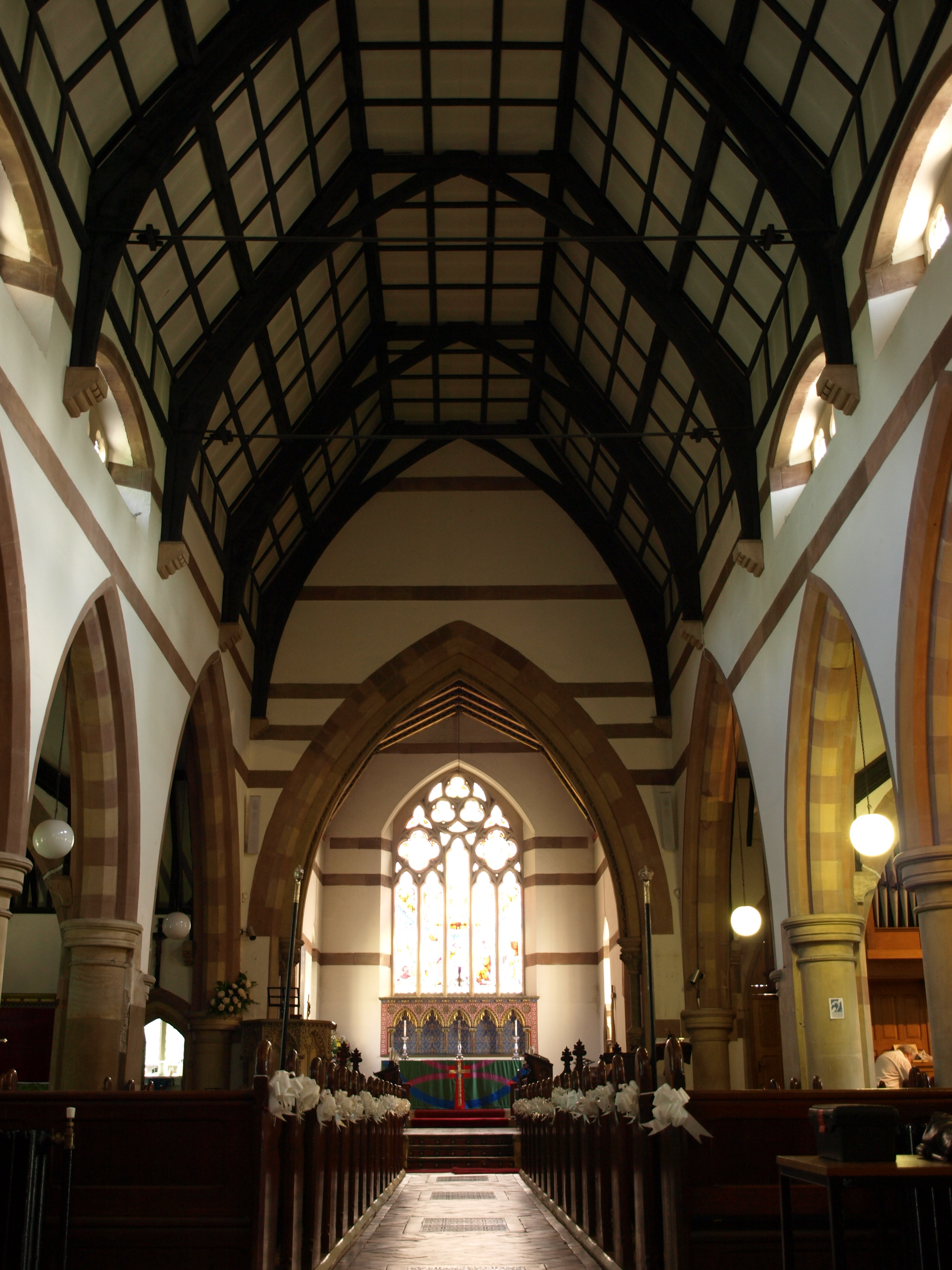
Looking east along the nave to the chancel

There are nine stained-glass windows by Hardman & Co.

- East window. The Ascension, 1861, given by George Elkington in memory of his first wife Mary.
- West window. The Transfiguration, 1861, given by J.F. Ledsam. Above the window a small grisaille in memory of T.C. Humphries and his wife Eugenie.
- South west window. Mary and Martha, 1872, given by the Elkington family in memory of Margaret Morgan, second wife of George Elkington.
- South aisle south window. The Good Samaritan, 1866, in memory of George Elkington.
- South transept west window. Christ and Mary Magdalene, in memory of Hyla Elkington, died 1901.
- South transept south window. Worship of the Kings. In memory of John Meredith of Harborne, died 1851, and his wife Jane.
- South transept east window. Peter and John at the Tomb. In memory of Hyla Elkington (obscured by the organ).
- Lady Chapel north window. Healing and Resurrection, given by Edward Holmes in memory of his wife Anne.
- Baptistry. Blessing the Children, given by J.F. Ledsam in memory of F.G. Ledsam.

== Incumbents ==
- 1862 Thomas Price (afterwards Rector of Claverdon, Warwickshire)
- 1887 Clement Price
- 1894 Edward John Barleet
- 1900 Clement Réné Sharpe
- 1903 Lawrence Banks Sladen
- 1909 Edmund Arthur Haviland (afterwards Archdeacon of Kimberley)
- 1915 Kenneth Donald Mackenzie (later Bishop of Brechin (Episcopal))
- 1920 Thomas Brancker
- 1926 Herbert James Rayner
- 1930 Reginald Pemberton Steer
- 1935 Mark Elliott Perfitt
- 1942 Frederick Rocke Pryce Parry
- 1957 Michael Webster, also afterwards Reton of Claverdon
- 1977 John Donald Waterstreet
- 1990 Christopher John Aldridge
- 2001 Martin Vincent Roberts
- 2009 James David Robert Cox
- 2019 Hazel White

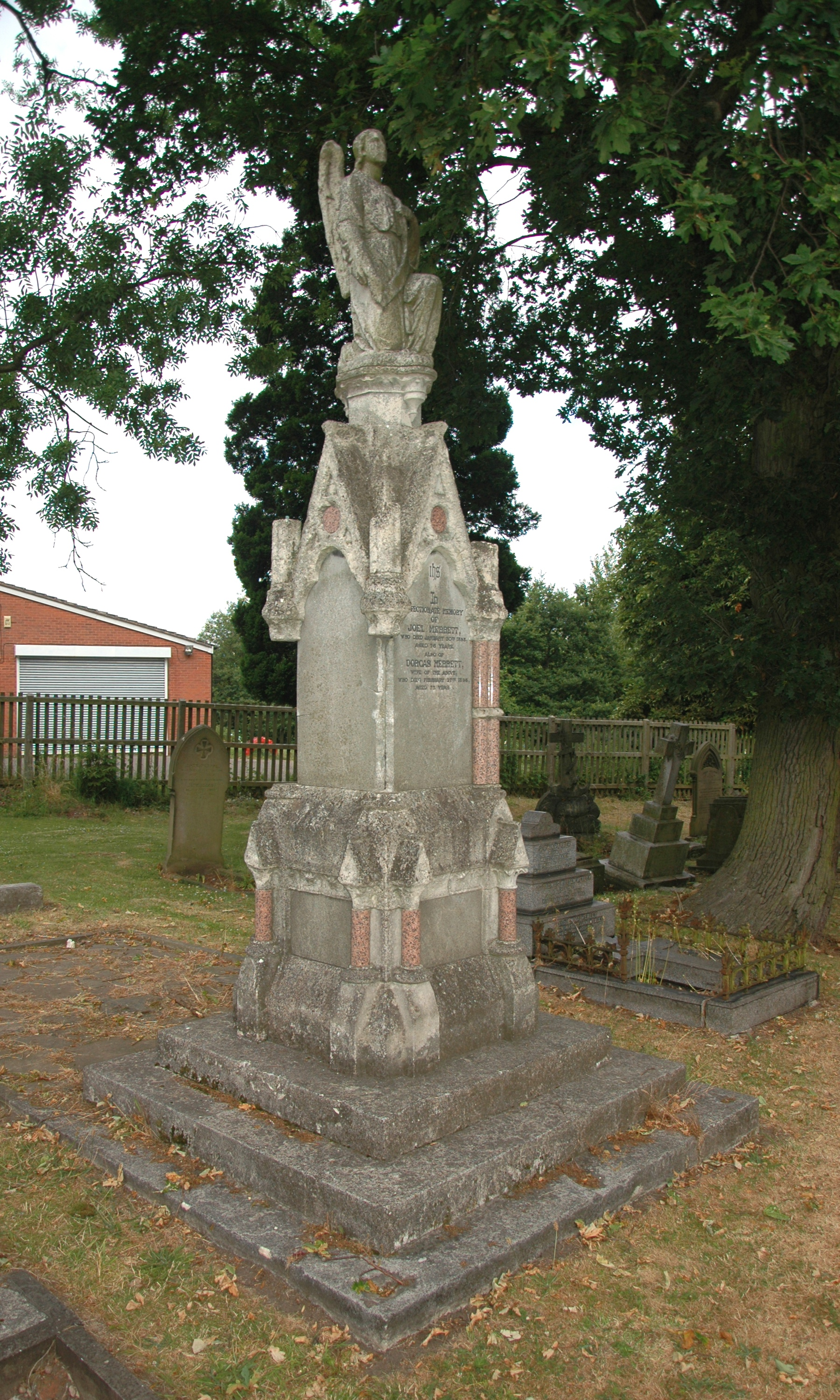
Grave and Gothic Revival monument in St Mary's churchyard of Joel and Dorcas Merrett, who died within a month of each other in 1893. Joel Merrett paid for the treble bell in the tower

== Bells ==
At the church's consecration on 12 September 1861 the tower had one bell. Five more were added in 1864, creating a ring of six that was first rung on 29 September 1864. In 1887 the parish commemorated the Golden Jubilee of Queen Victoria by adding two more bells, increasing them to a ring to eight that was first rung on 20 June 1887.

In 1922 the bells were found to be unsafe to ring, and they were silent for a decade until enough money was raised for rectification work. In 1932 Gillett & Johnston of Croydon re-founded all eight bells and they were re-hung. The tenor (the largest bell) now weighs 12 long cwt 1 qr 17 lb (1,389 lb or 630 kg) in and is tuned to the musical note G.

The Master of the Ringers for many years from the 1930s was William B. Cartwright, a local solicitor.

=== Inscriptions ===
Two of the bells are inscribed.

- No. 1 Bell — Treble: IN MEMORIAM FILIÆ ET S. M. VICTORIÆ ANNUM QUINQUAGESIMA REGNANTIS D. D. JOEL MERRETT. (Latin for "Given by Joel Merrett in memory of a daughter and the fiftieth year of the reign of Her Majesty Queen Victoria.")
- No. 8 Bell — Tenor: + BEATUS POPULUS QUI SCIT JUBILATIONEM. (Latin for "Happy are the people who know how to rejoice.")

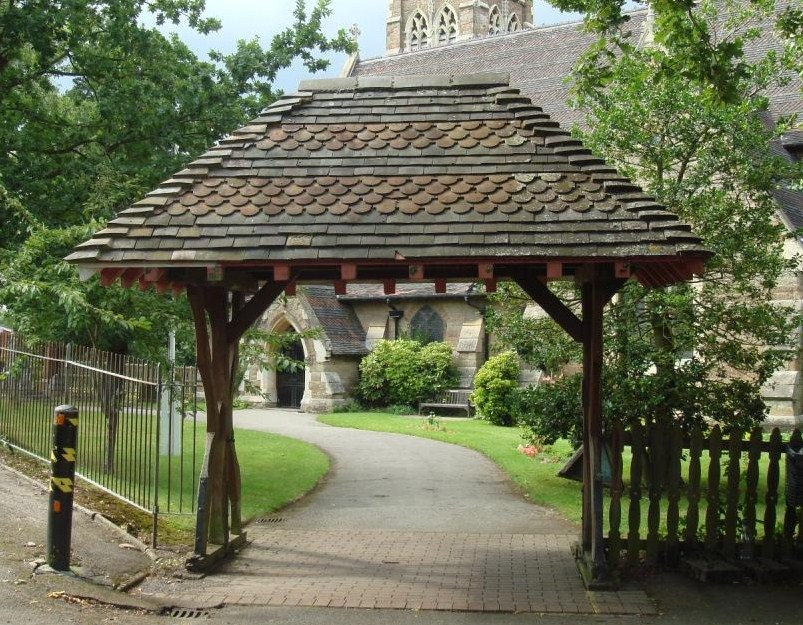
Lychgate to the churchyard

== Organ ==
An organ was installed in 1862 for the opening of the church built by Halmshaw of Camp Hill. In the 1870s it was moved to the south side of the chancel. In 1902 Nicholson and Company of Worcester rebuilt it, retaining much of the original pipework. Between 1925 and 1930 it was restored by Bird of Selly Park. In 1958 it was restored again, this time by Nicholson & Co, and the console was moved to the north side of the chancel. Between 1925 and 1930 it was restored by Bird of Selly Park. It was dedicated by the Right Reverend John Leonard Wilson, the fourth Bishop of Birmingham on 4 June 1958 at a recital by Sir George Thalben-Ball, the Birmingham City Organist. Sheffield Organs made further tonal improvements in 1996 and 1999.

=== Organists ===
- Frank Frederick Cuisset (previously organist of Bishop Ryder Church, Birmingham and Holy Trinity Church, Coventry, afterwards organist of Bushbridge Church, Godalming)
- ca. 1869–71 – ???? Mr. Evans
- ca. 1880 William Humphreys
- 1883-ca. 1889 F. Restall
- ca.1912-ca.1913 Mr. Sinclair
- 1929–34 Leonard Gibbons (afterwards organist of St George's Church, Edgbaston)
- 1934–85 Leslie John Barker ALCM
- 1950–70 Keith Collyer, Deputy Organist
- 1960s Dennis Mason, Deputy Organist
- 1986–90 David Twigg
- 1990–2025 John Stormont
- 2025– Sarah Marshall

The Organist is also choirmaster and a robed choir leads the worship at the principal Sunday services. Other choral occasions include the Christmas Festival of Lessons and Carols, and a passion cantata, such as Stainer's Crucifixion, in Holy Week. There are also organ recitals and concerts.

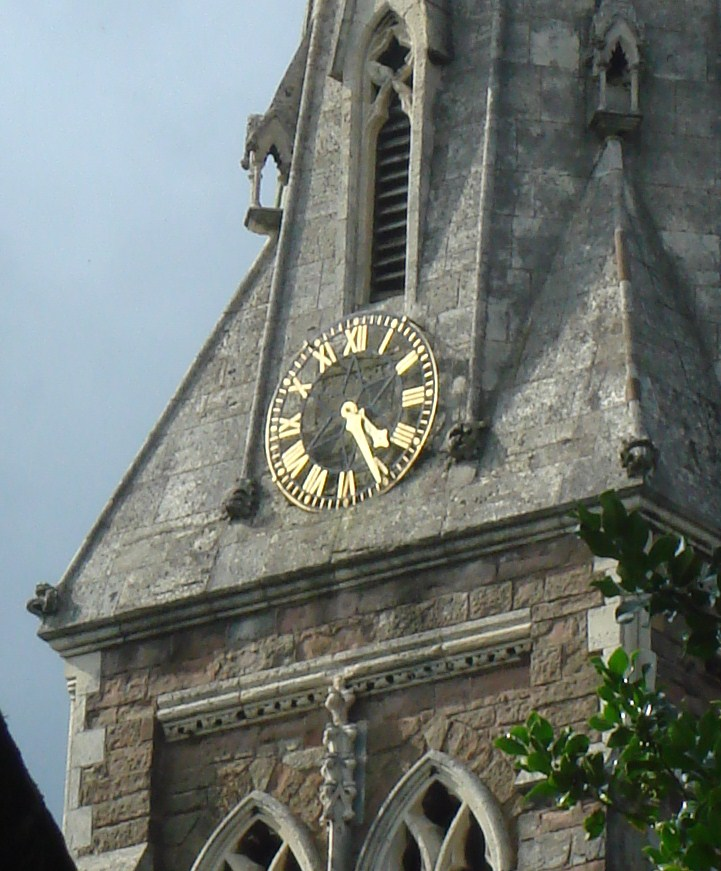
Clock on the steeple

== Tower clock ==
St Mary's has a tower clock that chimes the hours and quarter hours. It was installed in 1887, the year of the Golden Jubilee of Queen Victoria. JB Joyce & Co of Whitchurch, Shropshire made the clock under the supervision of the Rev. Canon Cattley. It is made on the same principle as the clock designed by Edmund Beckett, 1st Baron Grimthorpe for the great clock at Westminster and the large clock at Worcester Cathedral. The cost was about £331 (equivalent to £40,000 in 2025), and was the gift of the widow and family of the late Benjamin Walters.

The frame is cast iron, horizontal and planed. It is 6 feet (1.8 m) long, 1 foot 9 inches (0.5 m) wide and 1 foot (0.3 m) deep, and is supported by beams that are built into the tower wall to preclude vibration. The wheels are of gunmetal and the pendulum beats every 1¼ seconds.

== Popular culture ==
St Mary's acoustics are considered fine, and the church has been used as a concert venue, rehearsal space and recording space. The church has frequently featured in the BBC soap opera Doctors.

== Sources ==
- Anonymous (1995). St Mary's Church, Selly Oak, Church guide.
- Leonard, Frank (1933). The History of Selly Oak.
- Pevsner, Nikolaus; Wedgwood, Alexandra (1966). Warwickshire. The Buildings of England. Harmondsworth: Penguin Books. pp. 201–202.
