= St Saviour's Church, Saltley =

St Saviour's
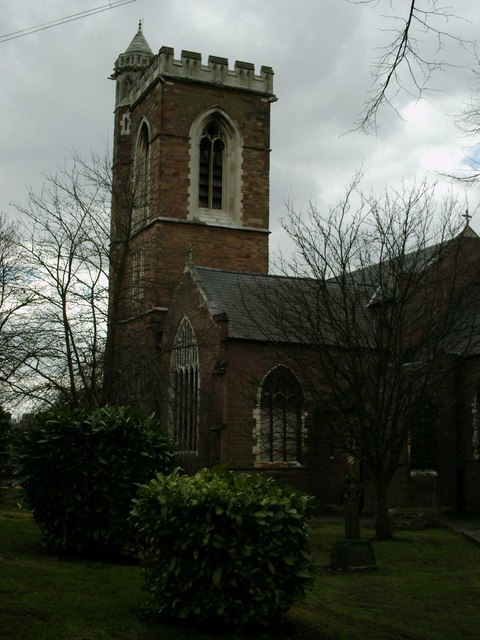
- St Saviour’s Church, Saltley
- St Saviour's
- 52°29′10.44″N 1°51′30.91″W
- OS grid reference: SP 09729 87666
- Location: Saltley Birmingham
- Country: England
- Denomination: Church of England
- Churchmanship: Anglo-Catholic

History
- Dedication: St Saviour

Architecture
- Heritage designation: Grade II listed
- Architect: Richard Charles Hussey
- Completed: 1850
- Construction cost: £6,000

Specifications
- Capacity: 810 people

Administration
- Diocese: Anglican Diocese of Birmingham
- Archdeaconry: Birmingham
- Deanery: Aston
- Parish: St Mark with St Saviour, Saltley

Clergy
- Priest: Fr Alan Thompson

St Saviour's Church, Saltley is a Grade II listed parish church in the Church of England in Birmingham.

== History ==
The foundation stone was laid on Tuesday 24 October 1848. A brass plate was attached to the foundation stone with the inscription:

This first stone of the Church at Saltley, in the parish of Aston juxta Birmingham, was laid by the Right Hon Lord Littleton on the 24th day of October 1848. Charles Bowyer Adderley, Esq., patron; Richard Charles Hussey, architect; Charles Branston, Edward Gwyther, contractors.

It was built as a Commissioners' church with a grant of £300. Another £500 was donated by Joseph Wright, and the remainder was funded by Charles Adderley, 1st Baron Norton to cover the £6,000 cost. The church was consecrated on 28 July 1850 by James Prince Lee the Bishop of Manchester (in the absence of Henry Pepys the Bishop of Worcester).

The tower was added in 1871.

== Organ ==
The church contained an organ by Halmshaw. A specification of the organ can be found on the National Pipe Organ Register.
