= Joseph Frederick Ledsam =

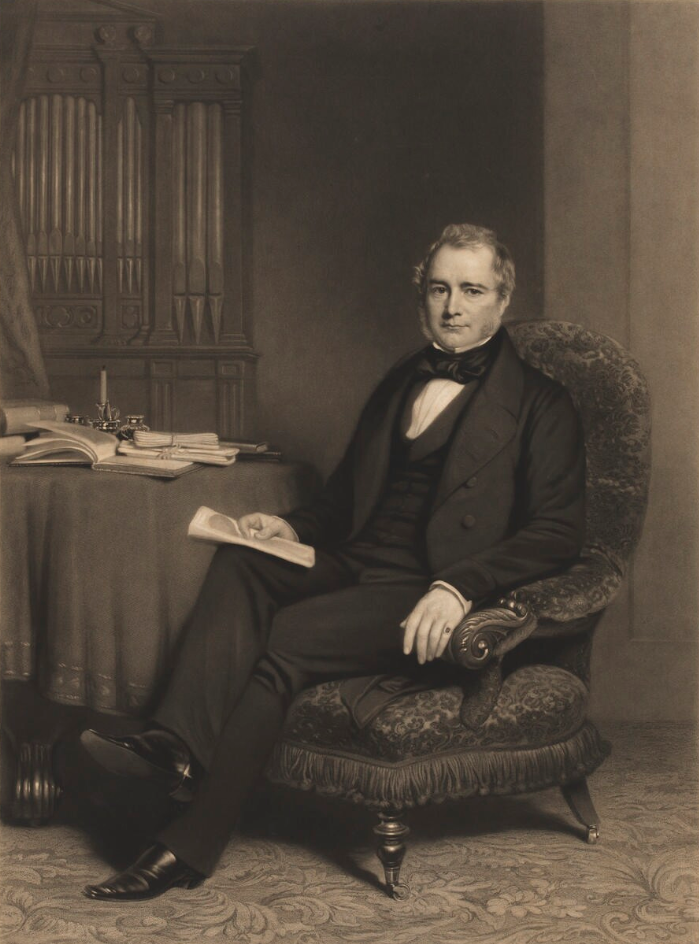
- 1852 Mezzotint by Samuel Cousins (engraver), after Eden Upton Eddis (painter)
- Born: 16 April 1791
- Died: 29 December 1862

Joseph Frederick Ledsam (16 April 1791 - 28 December 1862) was a Deputy Lord Lieutenant of Warwick, High Sheriff of Worcestershire (1848-1849) and deputy chairman of the London and North Western Railway (1849-1862).

== Background ==
He was born on 16 April 1791 in Birmingham, the son of Joseph Moreton Ledsam (1767-1816) and Mary Bullock. He married Elizabeth Ann Ashton Goddington on 4 December 1817 in St Peter and St Paul’s Church, Aston. They had nine children: Frederick Goddington; Joseph; Mary Elizabeth; Frederick George; Anne Julia; Thomas Moreton; William; Emily Agnes; and James Goddington Ledsam.

== Career ==
He had an involvement in railways from an early stage, and became a director and deputy chairman of the London and Birmingham Railway. He was also chairman of the Warwick and Leamington Union Railway. In 1846 it was reported that he had invested £186,000 (equivalent to £18,750,000 in 2025) in railway speculation. In 1848 he was chairman of the Birmingham, Wolverhampton and Stour Valley Railway.

In 1849 he succeeded Charles Lawrence as deputy chairman of the London and North Western Railway.

He was also involved in other commercial undertakings holding the position of director of the Birmingham Banking Company and the Birmingham and Staffordshire Gas Light Company.

He acted in a philanthropic context being a governor of King Edward VI School, Birmingham and chairman of the Birmingham Triennial Music Festival. He was a significant contributor to the cost of building St Mary's Church in Selly Oak, a district of Birmingham here he had major land holdings, including Weoley Castle.

He died on 28 December 1862 and was buried on 3 January 1863 in Christ Church, Birmingham. His will was proved on 23 February 1863 and his estate was valued at under £60,000.

== Recognition ==
There is a street named Ledsam in Ladywood, Birmingham, as was another in Wolverton, since demolished.
