= Stockbury =

Village in Kent, England

Coordinates: 51°19′N 0°39′E

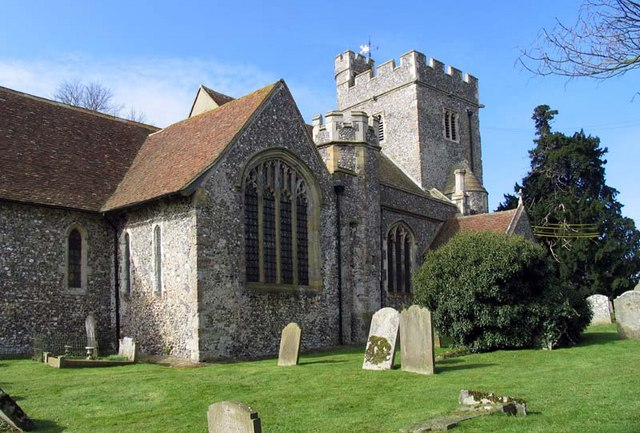
- St Mary Magdalene Church, Stockbury

- Location within Kent
- Population: 691 (2011 Census)
- District: Maidstone
- Shire county: Kent
- Region: South East
- Country: England
- Sovereign state: United Kingdom
- Post town: SITTINGBOURNE
- Postcode district: ME9
- Police: Kent
- Fire: Kent
- Ambulance: South East Coast
- UK Parliament: Faversham and Mid Kent

Stockbury is a village and civil parish in the Maidstone district of Kent, England. The population of the civil parish at the Census 2011 was 691.

In 1800, Edward Hasted noted, it was called in the Domesday survey, Stochingeberge, in later records, Stockesburie, and then Stockbury. Most of the parish was within the hundred of Eyhorne and a division of West Kent.

Most of the parish is on a valley (between Key Street, Sittingbourne and Detling Hill, Maidstone).

On St. Mary Magdalen's day, 22 July, there used to be a pedlars fair near the Three Squirrels public house.

The parish church, dedicated to St Mary Magdalene, is a Grade I listed building and the adjacent ringwork is a scheduled monument. Listed in the Domesday Book.

== See also ==
- Listed buildings in Stockbury
