= Bishop Ryder Church, Birmingham =

Coordinates: 52.484954°N 1.889233°W

Bishop Ryder Memorial Church, Birmingham
- Bishop Ryder Memorial Church, Birmingham
- OS grid reference: SP 07618 87452
- Location: Birmingham
- Country: England
- Denomination: Church of England

Architecture
- Architect(s): Thomas Rickman and Richard Charles Hussey
- Completed: 1838
- Construction cost: £4,500 (£431,331 in 2025)
- Demolished: 1960

Bishop Ryder Memorial Church, Birmingham, was a parish church in the Church of England in Birmingham from 1838 to 1960.

== History ==
Built on Gem Street in Gosta Green in Birmingham, it was a red brick and stone church designed by Thomas Rickman and Richard Charles Hussey in the Gothic style. It was built to commemorate Henry Ryder, Bishop of Lichfield and was consecrated in 1838. A parish was created out of St Martin in the Bull Ring in 1841.

The chancel was rebuilt in 1894 by J. A. Chatwin funded by J. C. Holder in memory of his father, Henry Holder. In 1925 the parish of St Mary's Church, Whittall Street, Birmingham was united with Bishop Ryder, and in 1939 part of the parish and the benefice of St Bartholomew’s Church, Birmingham, were united.

The church was demolished in 1960. Gem Street also no longer exists, but the church was located in the middle of the modern Aston University campus.

== Vicars ==
- M.A. Collinson 1838 – 1847
- Sampson Jervois 1847 – 1857
- John H. Burges 1857 – 1874
- Joseph Phelps Gardiner 1875 – 1900
- George Edwin Badger 1900 – 1933 (afterwards vicar of Cofton Hackett)
- C.H. Williams 1933 – 1940 (formerly chaplain of the Watts Naval School, Elmham, Norfolk, afterwards vicar of Christ Church, Highbury, London)
- Jack Richard Hassett 1940 – 1947
- Christopher Martindale Waddleton 1947 – 1949 (formerly curate at St Philip and St Jacob’s Church, Bristol)
- Edward A. Burton 1949 – 1951 (afterwards vicar of St Paul’s Church, Tipton)
- William George Griffin 1951 – 1956 (formerly vicar of St Paul’s Church, Lozells, afterwards vicar of All Saints' Church, Burton upon Trent)

== Bells ==
For the consecration in 1838, a single bell by William Taylor of Oxford was installed. In 1869 Blews and Son provided a ring of eight bells at a cost of £600. These were later recast by Taylors of Loughborough. When the church was closed the bells were transferred to St Peter's Church, Harborne.

== Organ ==
The first organ in the church cost £270 (equivalent to £24,200 in 2025) and was built by Theodore Charles Bates of London and opened on 7 December 1841.

This was replaced in 1882 when a new organ by J.C. Banfield was opened on 25 November at a cost of £350. It was renovated in 1939 by Walter James Bird. A specification of the organ can be found on the National Pipe Organ Register.

=== Organists ===
- William Elliott ca. 1846 - 1848
- George W. Elliott from 1848
- Frank Frederick Cuisset (afterwards organist of St Mary's Church, Selly Oak)
- A. Andrews until 1862
- Alfred Sears until 1888
- Alfred E Bateman-Brown 1888
- William Henry Johns 1888 - 1936 (formerly organist of St James' Church, Edgbaston)
- Frank Walford Grove from 1943 (formerly organist of St Margaret’s Church, Fletton)
- R.B. Jameson ca. 1945
