= Ss Peter and Paul Church, Eye =

Anglican church in Eye, Suffolk, England, UK

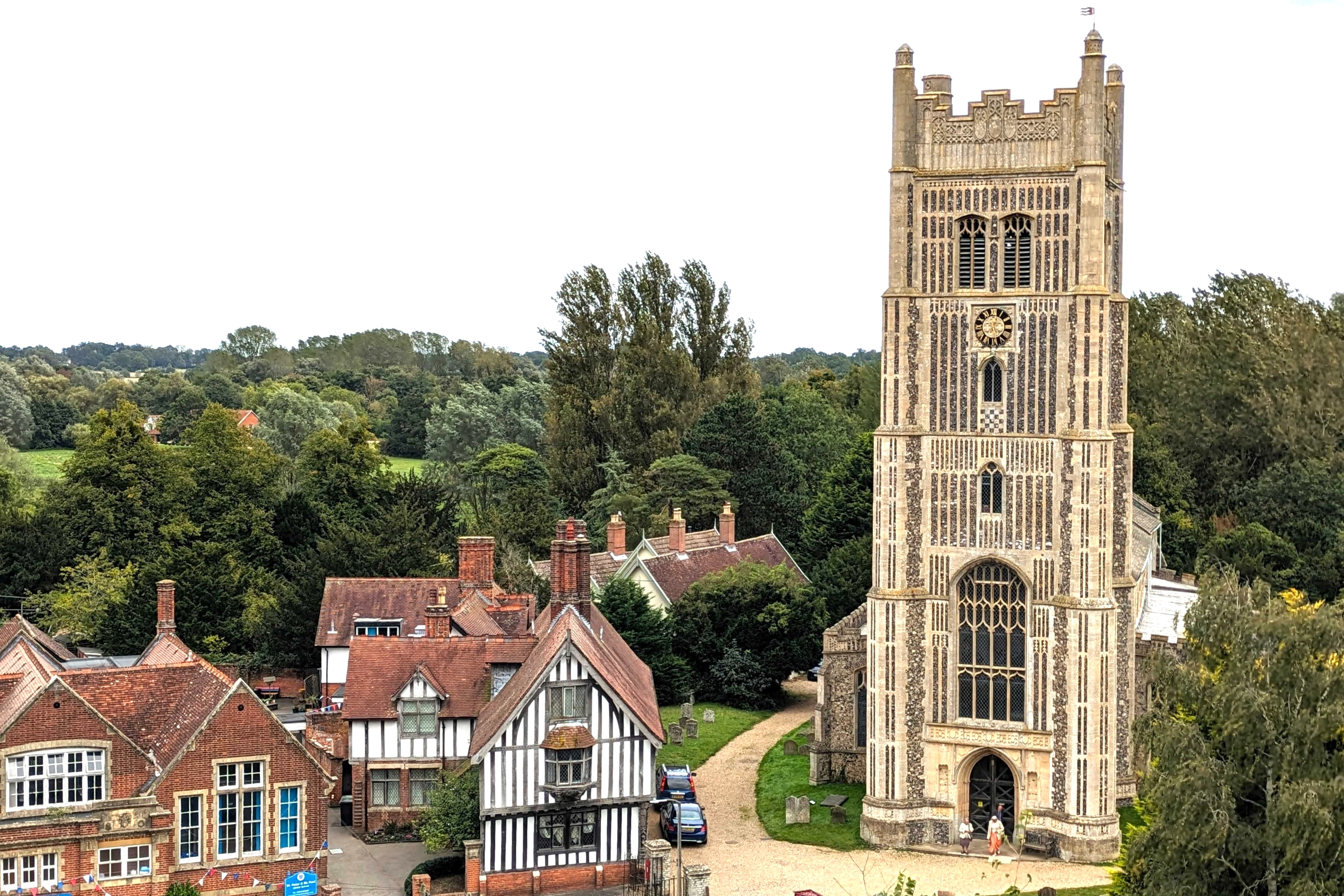
Eye Church taken from Eye Castle

Ss Peter & Paul Church is a Church of England parish church in the market town of Eye, Suffolk. It is a Grade I listed building for its historical and architectural importance. It is the only Anglican church in the town.

Eye is one of Suffolk's ancient boroughs. and the church is located just to the east of the old Eye Castle mound.

== History ==
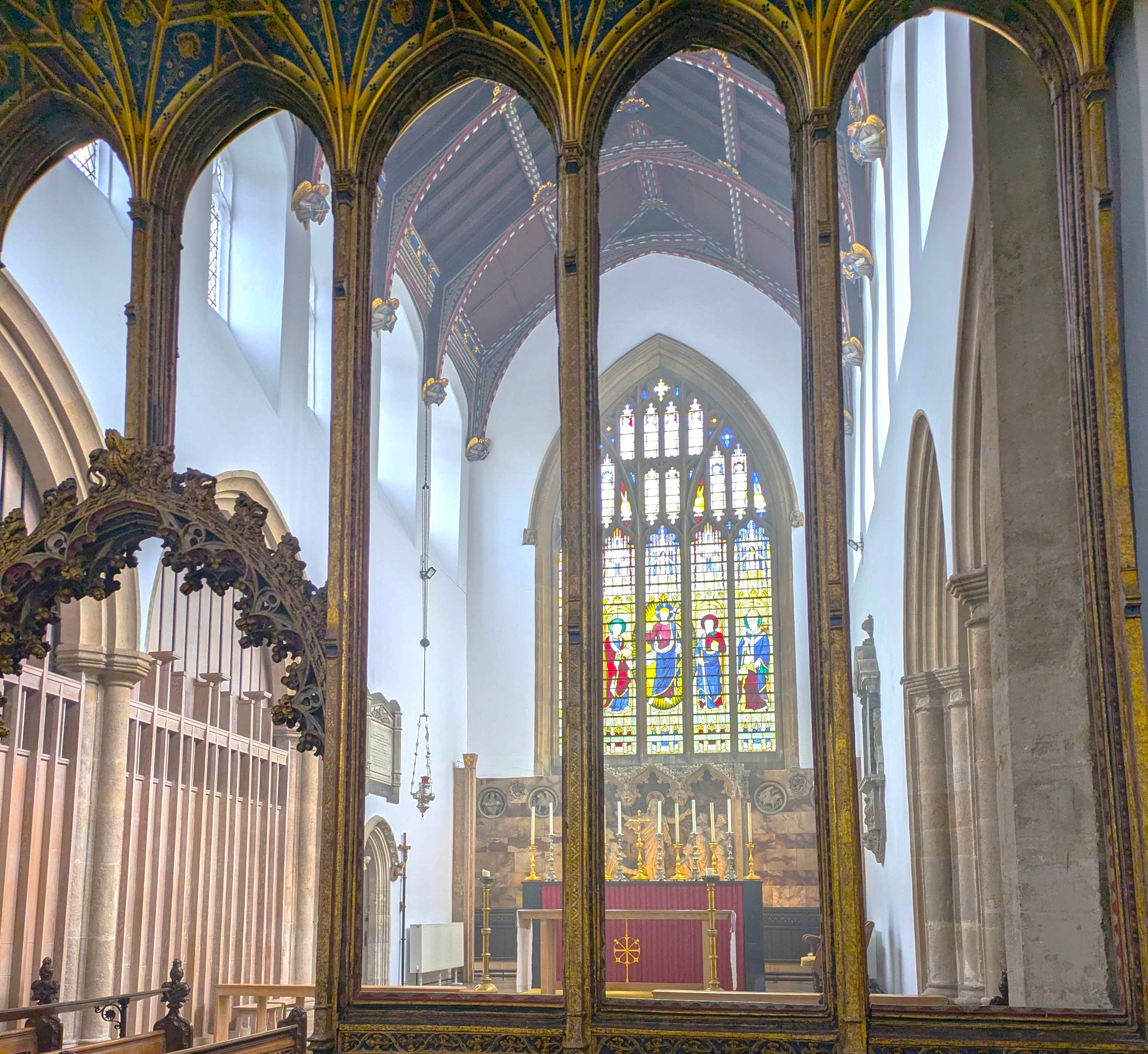
The Chancel at Eye Church

It is thought that Christians may have worshipped hereabouts for some 1000 years: a church near this site is mentioned in the Domesday Book (1086 AD)

This was Eye Priory, located some 400m east of the present church building and 150m east of the River Dove.

The Church of Ss Peter and Paul is mainly early 14th Century with additions in the 15th Century, The oldest part of the building is the south porch, part of which possibly dates to the late 1200s. There was major restoration undertaken in 1869 by J K Colling. Of particular note in the Colling's design of the octagonal font.

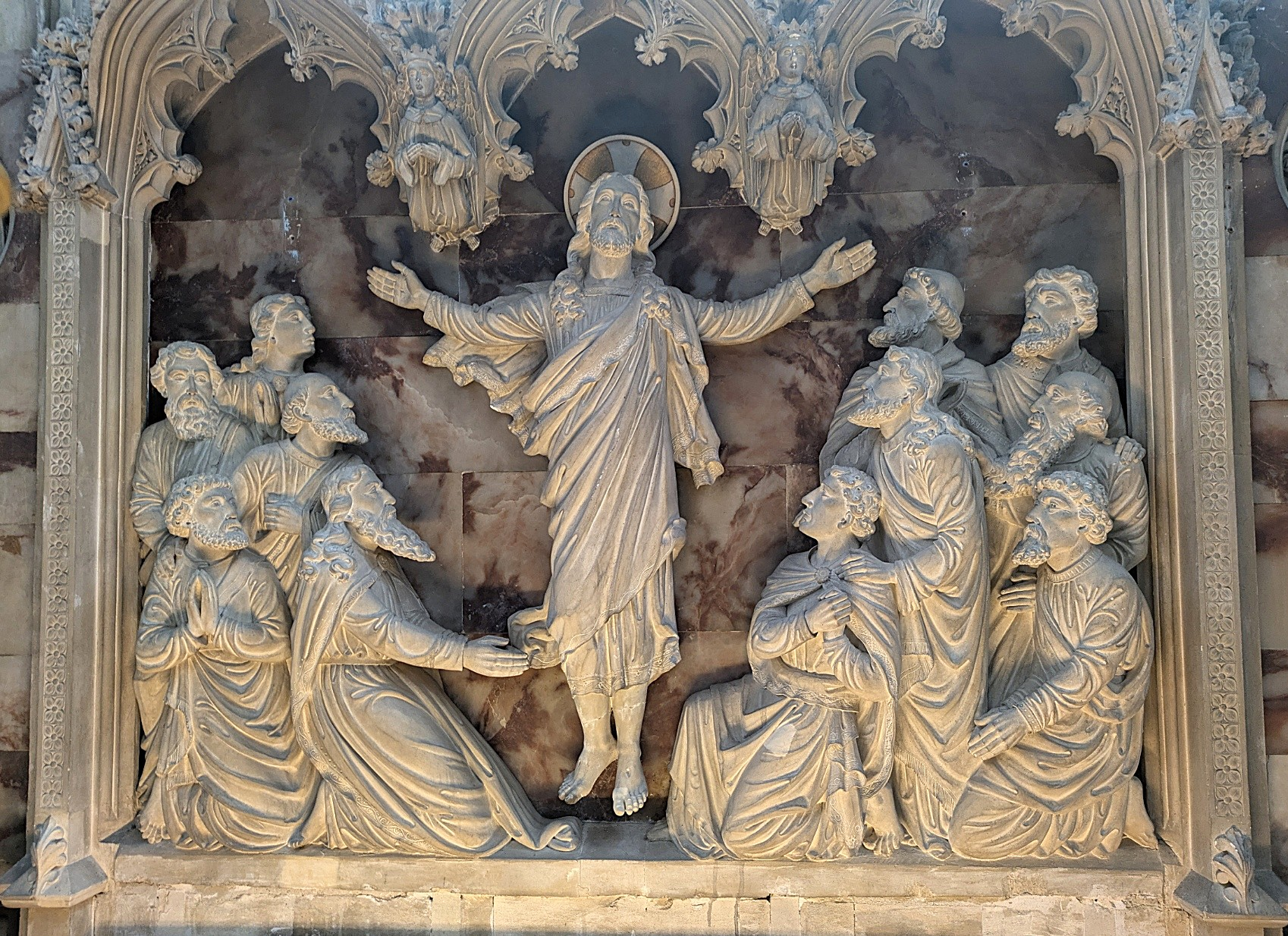
Reredos carving of the Ascending Christ flanked by his eleven disciples

Pevsner describes the west tower as ‘one of the wonders of Suffolk’, 101 feet high with flint flushwork from top to bottom on the west face. It is thought that the tower's construction commenced in the late 15th or early 16th century. A dendrological survey states, "A total of ten timbers from the tower were dendrochronologically sampled, of which one sample was found to have too few rings to analyse, and one timber did not date. The remaining eight were found to form a group of timbers most likely felled at the same time, probably in the period AD 1466-c.70" The total length of the church is 120 feet 9 inches (37 metres).

The Priest's door (in the south chancel wall) is unusual in that it is entered under a flying buttress. While the door remains visible from the outside, it was blocked on the inside in 1911 when the SE chapel (now named The Lady Chapel) was remodelled for "Divine Service". A plaque mounted on the south wall indicates that this was done as a memorial to Frederic Waite, "for 13.1/2 years Churchwarden of Eye Parish Church", dated Easter 1911.

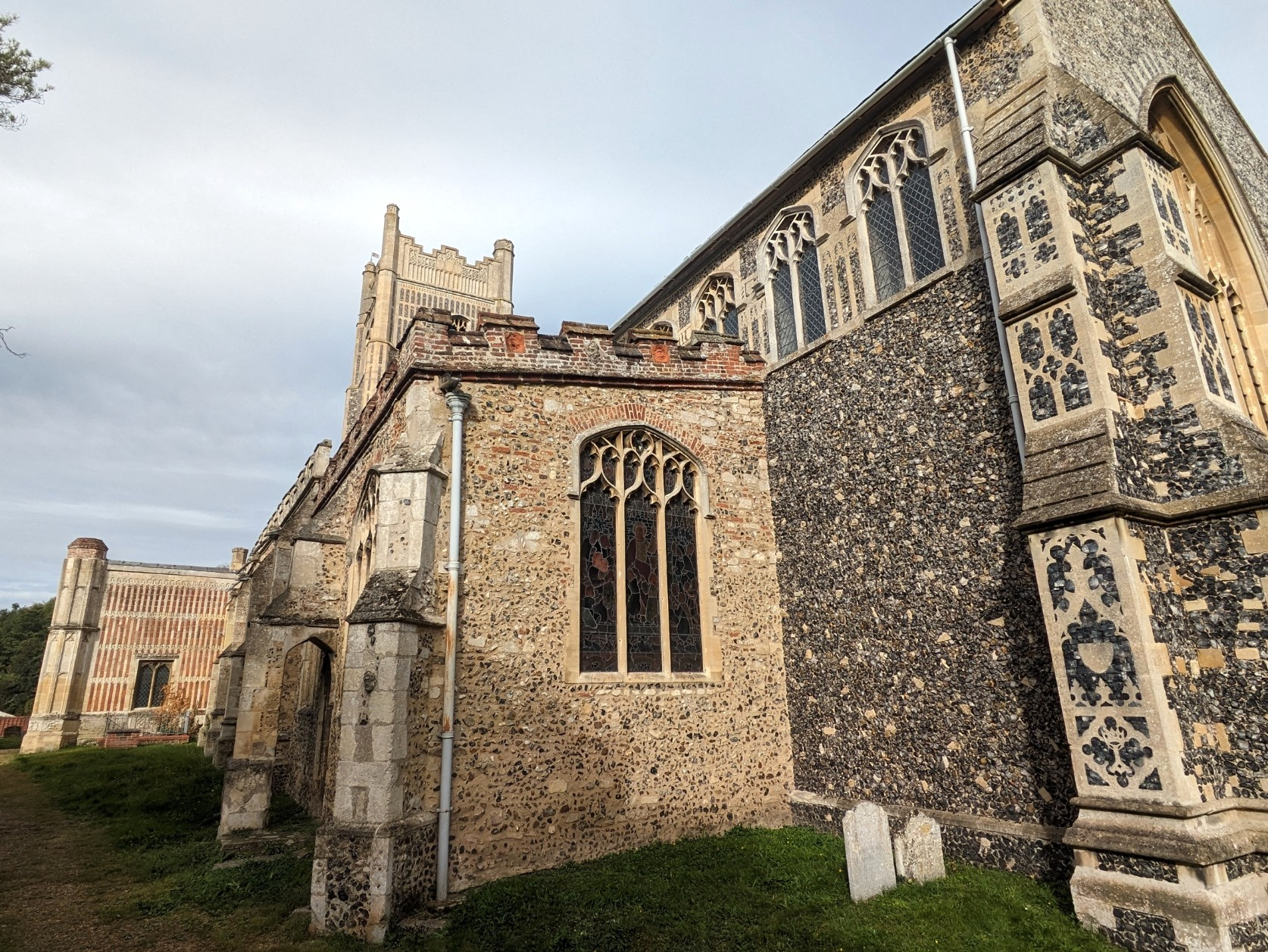
SE corner - Lady Chapel (centre) with Priest Door under buttress

Of the several monuments in the church are two almost identical 16th century altar-tombs, fashioned in Purbeck marble. One is canopied tomb at the west end of the north aisle, for Nicholas Cutler (died 1568) and Elionora Cutler,(died 1549). Elionora was daughter of John Mynne, and English Officer of Arms. This monument was originally sited in the sanctuary but later moved to its present location blocking, what was originally, the north door into the nave (which is still visible from the outside). (Nicholas Cutler was MP for Liverpool, 1545–47, and father of Charles Cutler, d.1582, who was MP for Eye)

The other, also a canopied tomb, is sited at the north side of the Lady Chapel altar and commemorates William Honnyng, who died in 1569. Honnyng had been a Parliamentarian, Clerk of the Signet (c.1544-45), and Clerk of the Privy Council (1543-48).

In the centre of the north aisle wall is a shallow mid-14th century tomb recess within which is Lough Pendred’s 'Shrine of our Lady', carved in wood in 1973 This matches a smaller carving by Pendred of 'Our Lady and Child' which is sited in the Lady Chapel.

Behind the High Altar and below the Great East Window is an intrically-carved reredos depicting the figure of Christ, Ascending into Heaven, attended by His eleven disciples. This was erected in 1908 in memory of Major The Honourable Edward Reginald Bateman- Hanbury (1858 – 1907) by “His family and many friends”. The carving was designed by the then Vicar, Revd. John Pritchitt (incumbent 1904 – 1907). It was carved by Hems & Sons of Exeter and constructed of Caen stone, alabaster and marble.

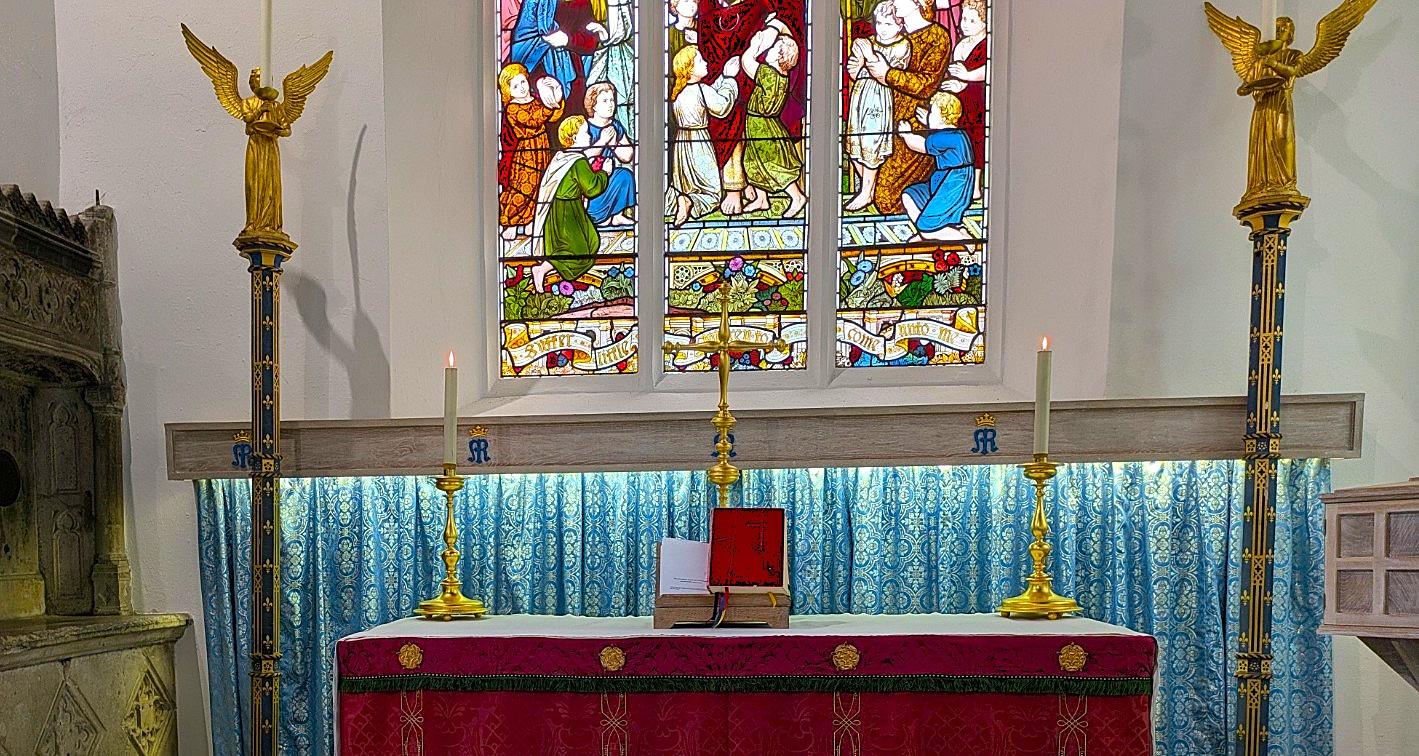
The Lady Chapel

Both the tower and the 15th century two-storey south porch bear the arms of John de la Pole (1442-1491) 2nd Duke of Suffolk. The tower belfry has a ring of eight bells. Two of the bells bear the inscription, "Miles Gray made me in 1640".

Inside the south porch (on the west wall) is a dole table, built of brick and with a stone top, given by Henry Cutler in 1601. The purpose of the dole table was the place where debts, tithes and church dues were paid as well as distribution of money or bread to the poor of the parish. Let into the wall above the table, and below the window, is a stone tablet bearing the inscription, (in block capitals):

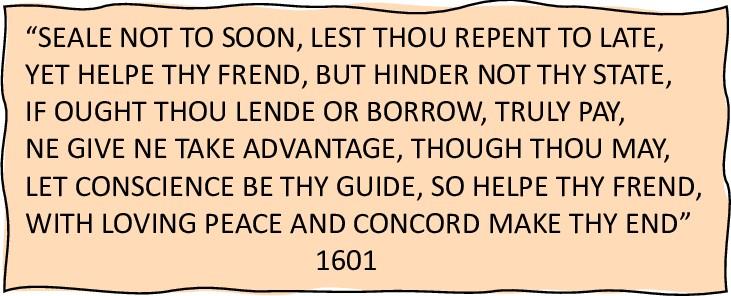
Copy of inscription over dole table

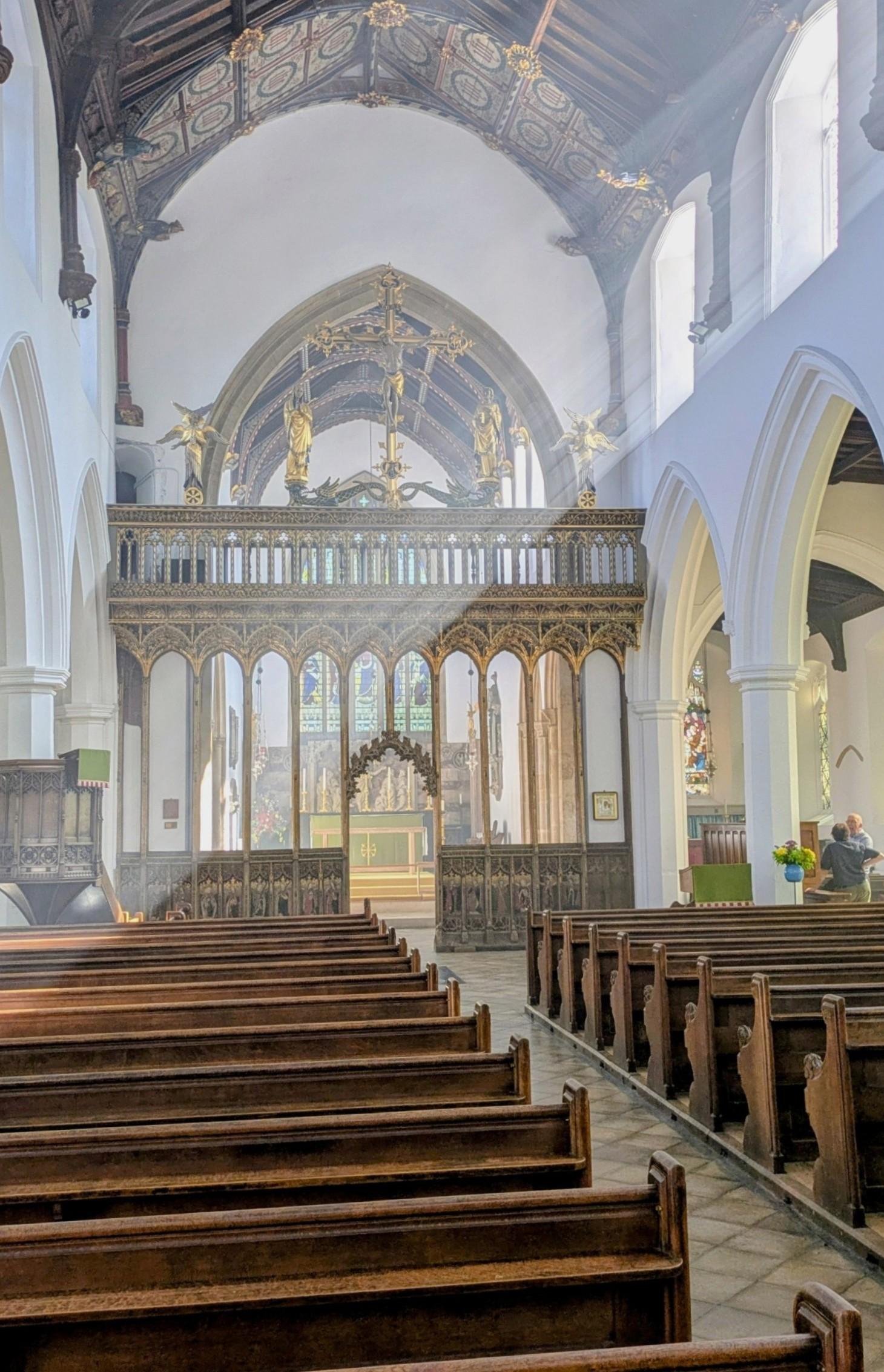
The Nave

An inscribed panel on the front of the dole table indicates that it was donated (in 1601) by Henry Cutler, the son of Nicholas Cutler and Elionora Cutler, aforementioned.

Above the south porch is an unused parvise chamber. While the porch itself is contemporaneous with the tower (mid- to late-15th century), the door arch leading from the porch into the church is dated earlier, probably the 13th century.

In common with many churches in Suffolk (and Cambridgeshire), some damage was done in the Puritan era by William Dowsing (1596–1668), also known as "Smasher Dowsing" (or "Basher Dowsing"), an iconoclast. Dowsing was the Parliamentary Commissioner, acting under a warrant from the 2nd Earl of Manchester, Edward Montagu. Dowsing's Journal, dated 1643/4, has the following entry:

(Journal entry no.) '266. Eaye [Eye], Aug. 30. 7 superstitious pictures in the chancel, and a cross; one was Mary Magdalen; all in the glass; and 6 in the church windows; many more had been broke down afore.'

There was significant re-ordering in the 1920s and 1930s, much of it to the design of Sir Ninian Comper, the famous church architect.

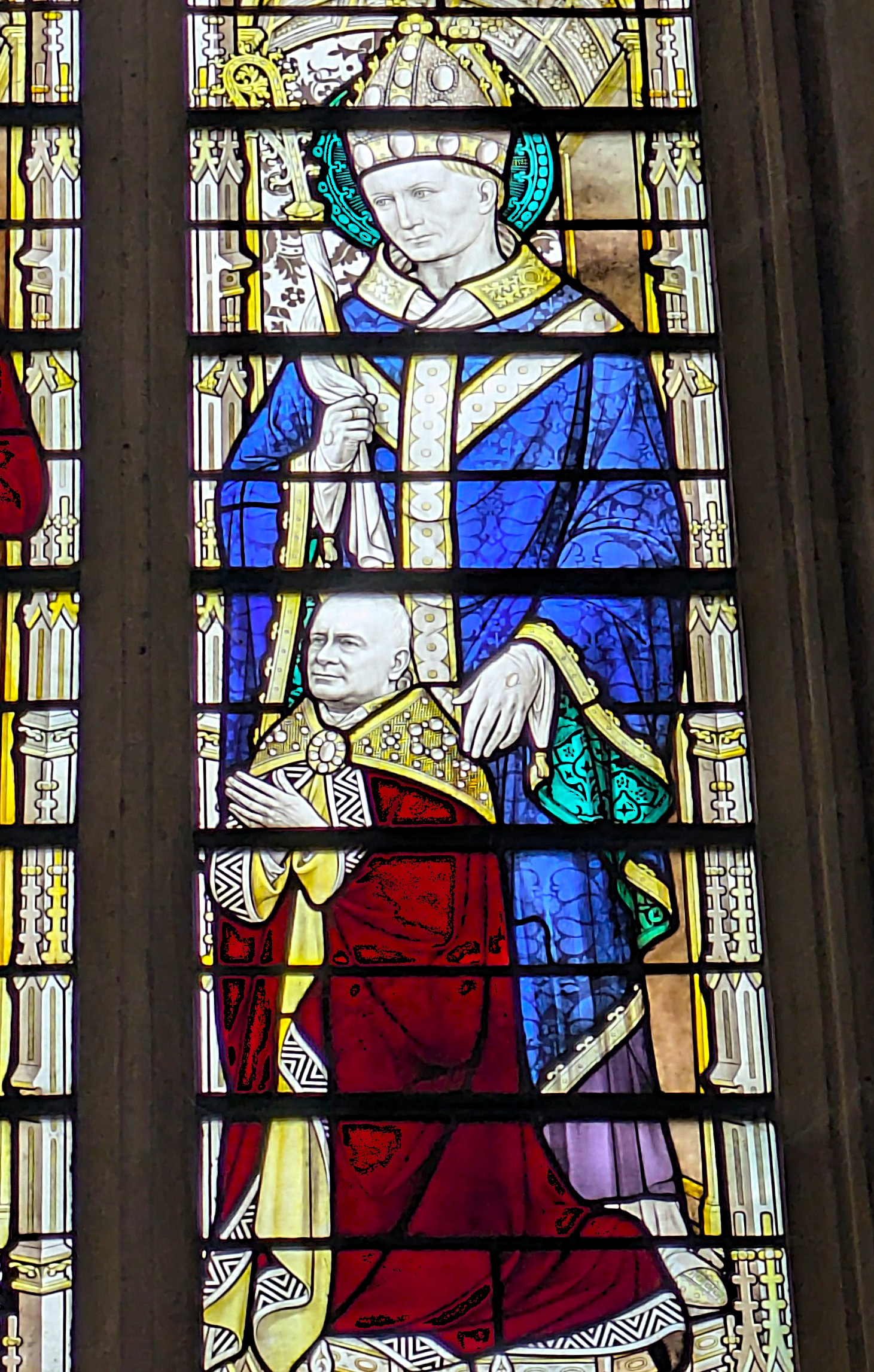
Fr Oakey kneeling in front of St Polycarp

His work included:

- the addition of the rood-loft to the existing 14th century screen. This included the Rood Crucifix, figures of the Blessed Virgin Mary and St. John, two six-winged sepaphim, and serpents (representing Evil) at the foot of the Cross (1925).
- the whole sanctuary re-ordered which included the sanctuary lamps. The sanctuary has since been further re-ordered but the original lamps have been retained.
- decoration of the Chancel roof and the 'canopy of honour' over the Rood
- the design of the Great East Window. This depicts the Risen Christ flanked by St John, St Peter, St Paul and St Polycarp. This depiction of Polycarp is relatively unusual in a window of this type; it was dedicated in memory of John Polycarp Oakey, parish priest of Eye who died in 1926. The funding for window was raised by Oakey's family and friends, as stated in the glass at the bottom of the window. The figure of St. Polycarp shows the late Revd. Oakey shielded by mantle of the Saint's chasuble.
- in 1932, Comper designed the imposing and graceful font cover (the font being situated at the west-end of the Nave).

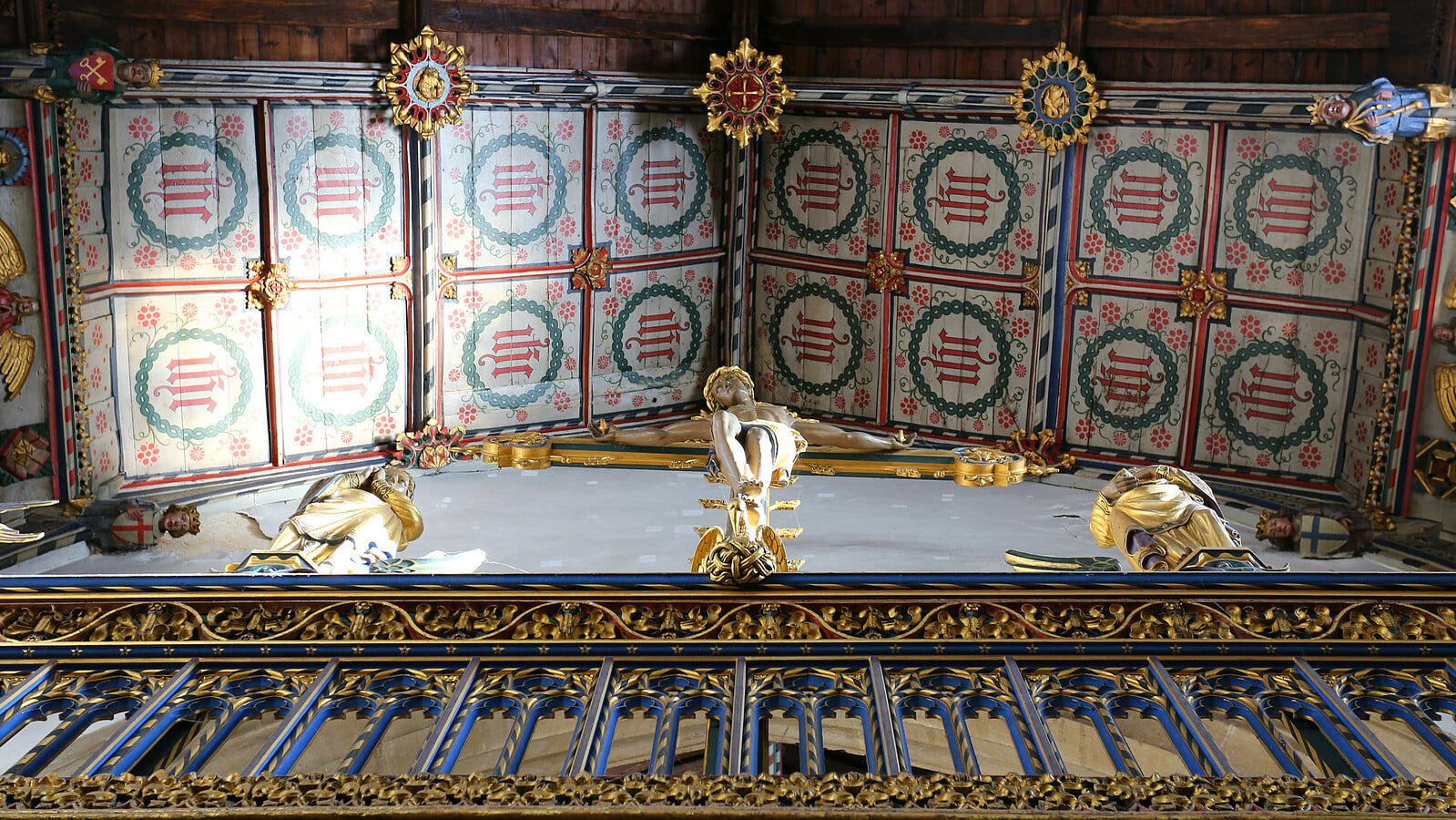
Canopy of honour over the rood - with the sacred monogram IHS

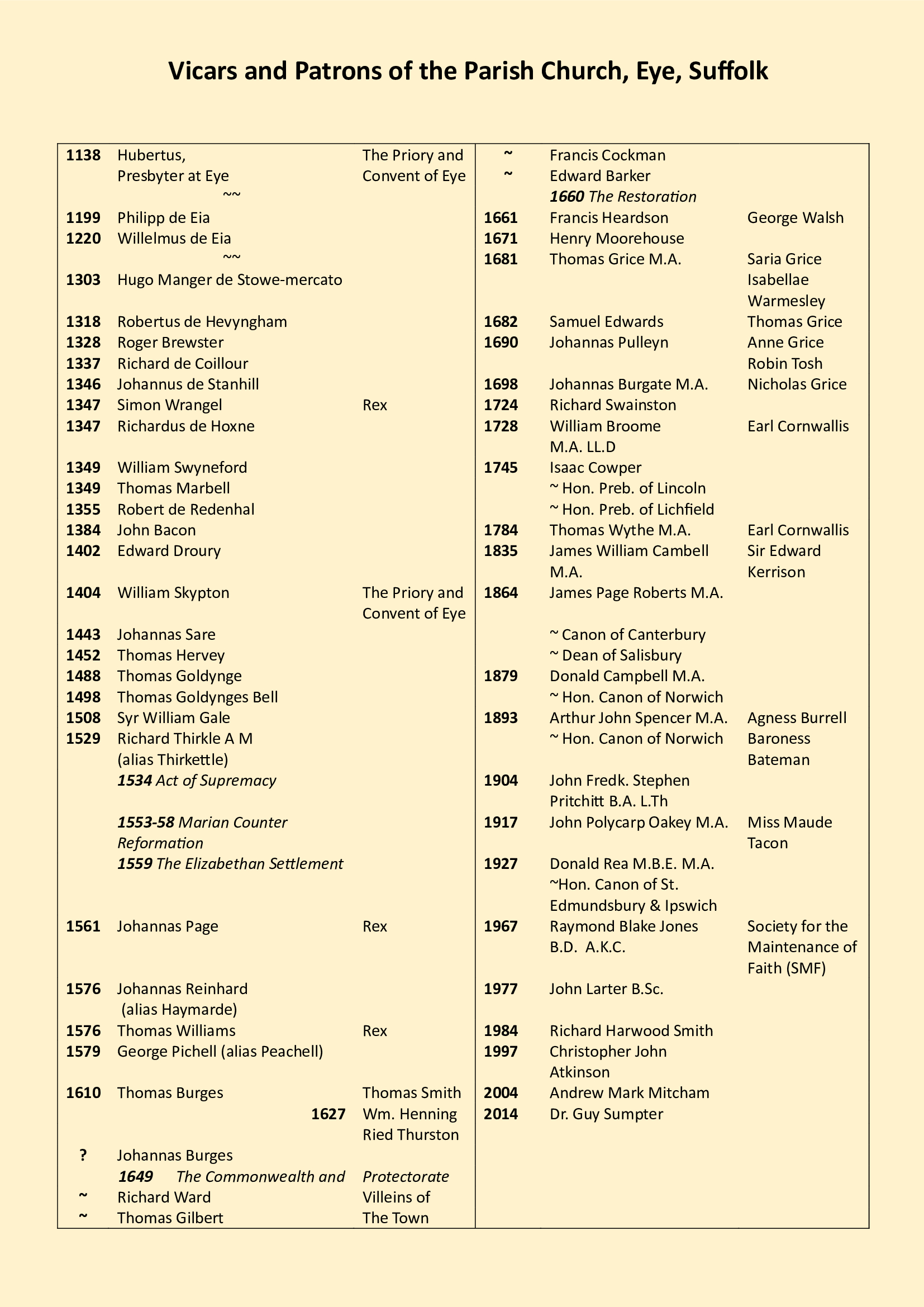
Vicars and Patrons of the Church

Further archeological surveying was carried out in 2009 in preparation for re-ordering the north-east part of the building to enable the construction of the current Abbey Room (comprising toilet accommodation, a kitchen area, meeting/choir robing room). The survey "revealed six brick-lined graves, all of probable 18th or early 19th century date" This North Chapel, (formerly the Lady Chapel), was dedicated to Santa Maria del Popolo. It is separated from the chancel and north aisle by screens of limed oak which were installed in 1969. Beyond that, in the north-east corner of the building is the Clergy Vestry/Sacristy with doors to the outside (north), the Abbey Room, and directly into the Sanctuary: this door being fitted with an ornamental Sanctuary ring and fastening.

The names of the Parish Vicars and Patrons, from 1138, have been recorded.

== The Rood Screen ==
The figures painted in the panels at the base of the screen are of particular interest and are thought to date from about 1480. They depict various saints (mostly martyred) and some English monarchs. Most of the panels have survived in good condition over many centuries. There are 15 of these; looking from left to right:

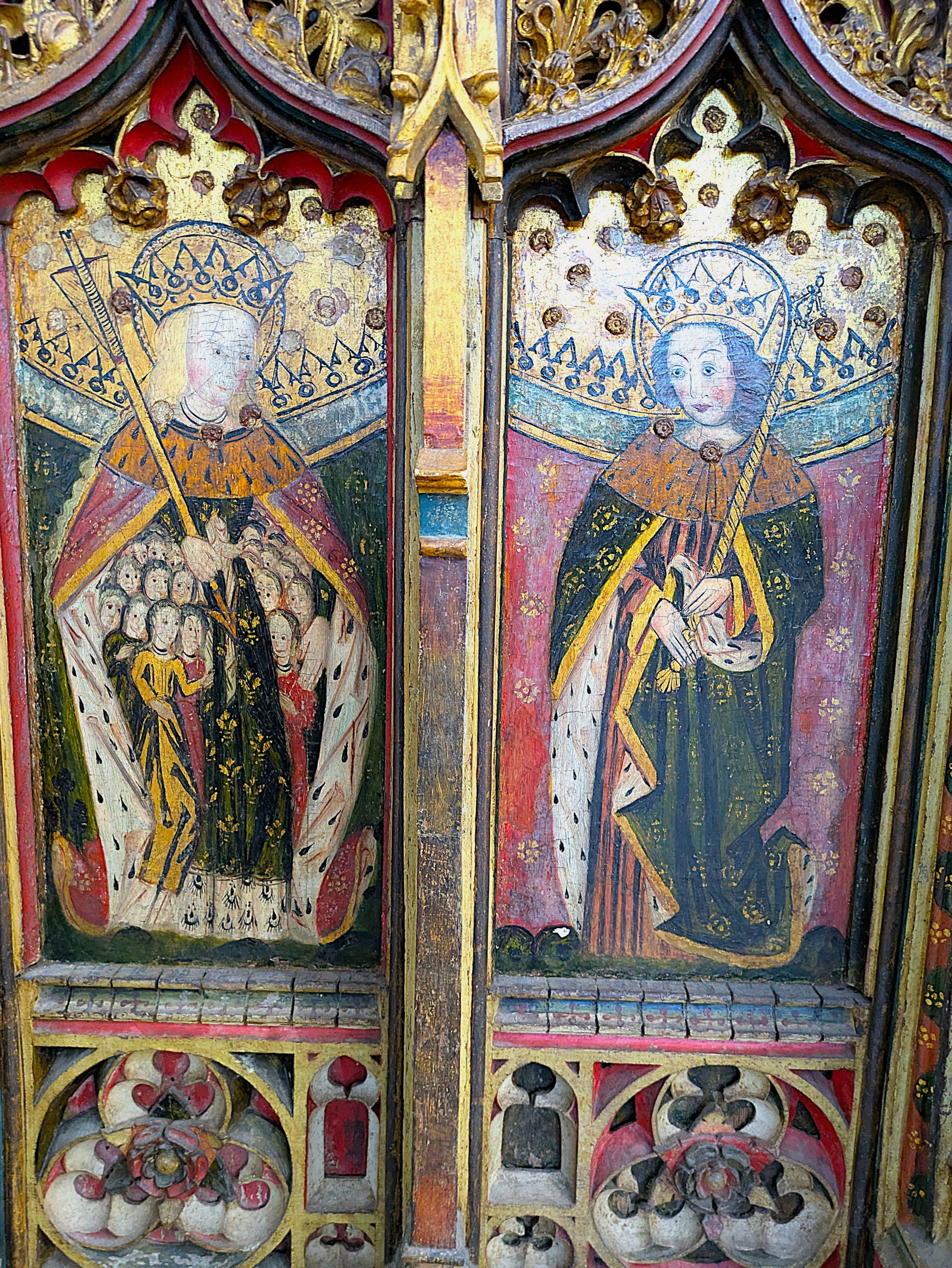
Detail of the panels depicting St Ursula and King Henry VI

1. This is badly damaged and not possible to identify but St Paul has been suggested. However, the figure is wearing a crown which may indicate a royal personage. The figure appears to be male so, possibly, an English king

2. St Helen – died in about 330, Empress, mother of Constantine the Great

3. St Edmund, King of East Anglia, murdered by Danish invaders in Hoxne in 870. Arrow in right hand, sceptre in left

4. St Ursula with a group of virgins beneath her mantle, all martyred by the Huns of Cologne in the 4th century. Sceptre in both hands

5. King Henry VI who died in the Tower of London in 1471, although never canonised. Sceptre in both hands, ring on right hand

6. St Dorothy, virgin and martyr who died in 313. Basket of fruit and flowers in right hand, palm in her left hand

7. St Barbara of the late 3rd century, condemned to death by beheading for having become a Christian. Tower in right hand and palm in her left hand

8. St Agnes, executed 21st january 304, at the age of 12 or 13 for refusing to deny God and for wishing to preserve her virginity. She is depicted with sword running through her throat and a lamb leaping up to her (the lamb - a symbol of her purity)

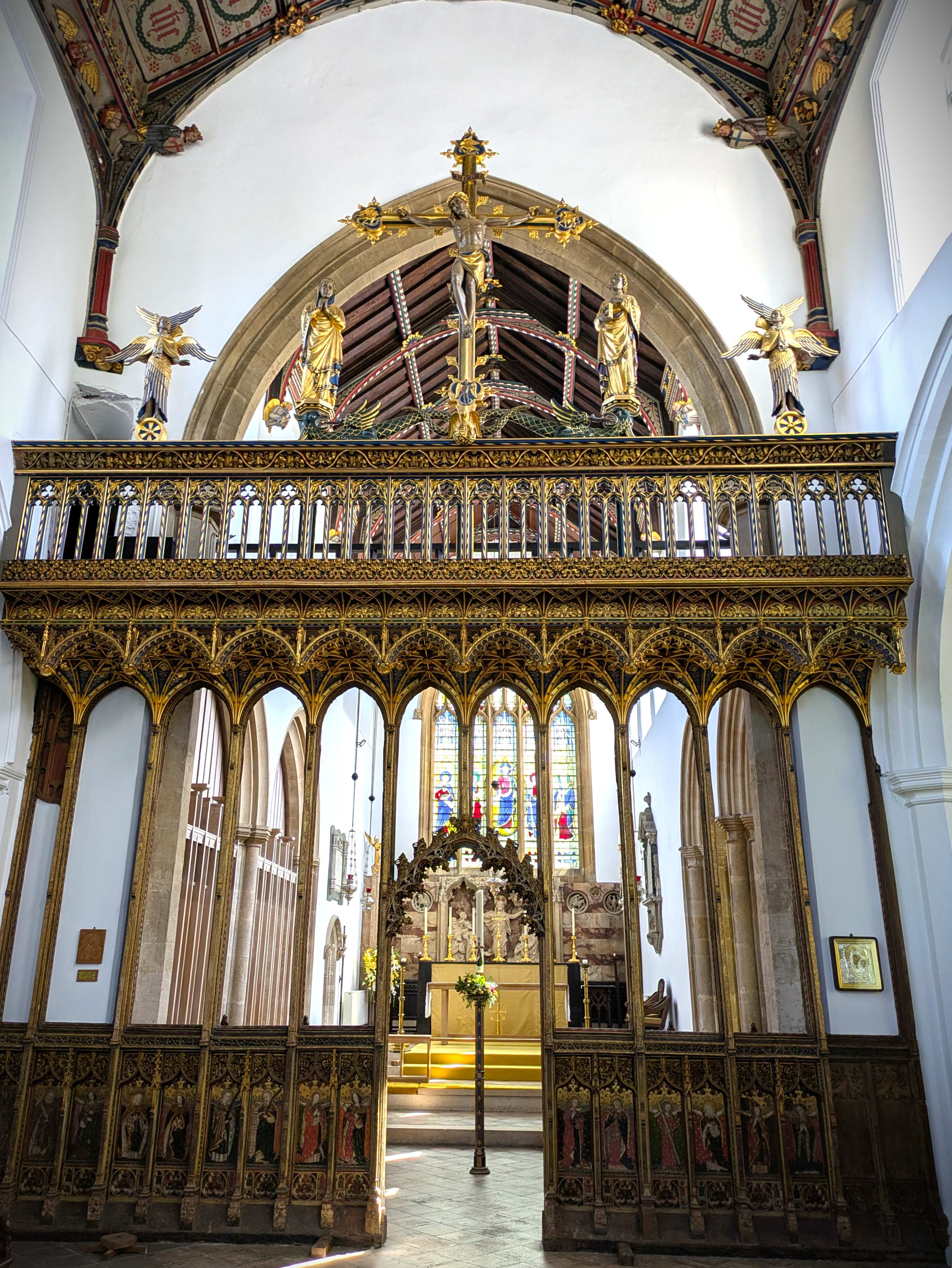
The Screen at Eye Church

9. St Edward the Confessor, King of England from 1042 to 1066. Ring in right hand and sceptre in left

Here is the arch from the Nave and Chancel, then continuing left to right:

10. St John the Apostle (not martyred, but thought to have had a natural death). Having once being offered a cup of hemlock intended to kill him, he drunk it after having blest it and felt no harm. Represented with head upraised and a winged serpent issuing from his chalice

11. St Catherine, of the 4th century who, after much torture, was beheaded with a sword. Represented by a wheel, sword and book.

12. William of Norwich, said to have been martyred as a boy by Jews in 1144 (disputed). William was never beatified or canonized

13. St Lucy, martyred in 304. Emblems: a knife and her eyes on a book or platten

14. St Thomas of Canterbury martyred 1170 in Canterbury Cathedral by followers of Henry II

15. St Cecilia, patroness of musicians, martyred by the sword in 3rd century

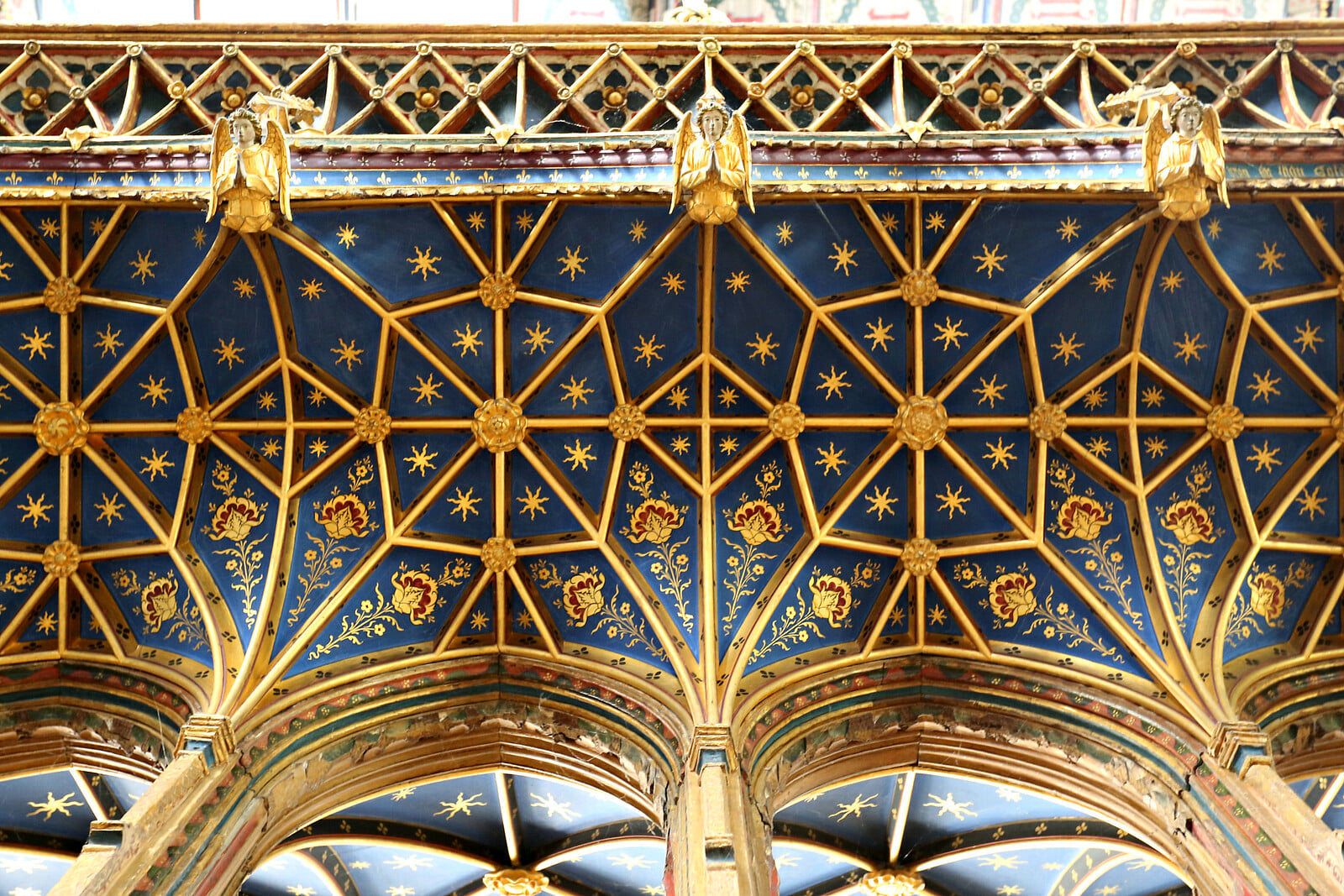
Underside of the rood loft

The screen is reputed to originate from Great Massingham Priory in Norfolk. (An Augustinian Priory was founded in the parish [of Massingham] before 1260, and was dedicated to St Mary and St Nicholas (NHER 2319). The Priory was dissolved in 1538)

The underside if the rood loft is decorated, gold on a blue background, with stars and flowers, with the front arches coming down to angelic figures facing the chancel and High Altar

== Anglo-Catholic heritage ==
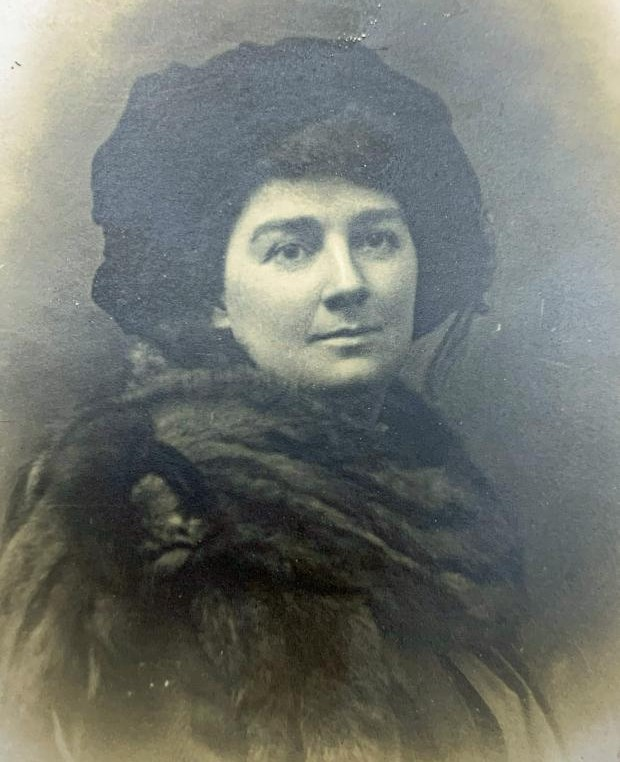
Miss Maude Tacon (1881 -1954)

Over the last 150 years, or thereabouts, the Church has developed and maintained a form of worship that is of a traditionally Anglo-Catholic pattern with emphasis on the importance of the sacraments, and the celebration of the Eucharist in particular. The worship is enhanced by a strong musical tradition which has continued to the present.

Although many clergy have faithfully upheld this tradition over the years, of particular note are:

- Revd. John. P. Oakey (r. 1917-27) who continued the moderate catholic tradition of his two predecessors: Revd. Canon Arthur John Spencer (r. 1893-1904) and Revd. John F. S. Pritchitt (r. 1904-10). Oakey was supported in his work by Miss Maude Tacon (of Brome Hall) who was a devout Anglo-Catholic and who became Patron of Living during Oakey's incumbency, and was a great benefactress to the church. She remained Patron until her death in 1954.

Revd. John Robinson Vincent (r. 1927-34) who oversaw the completion of Comper's restoration work in the early 1930s.

Revd. Canon Donald Rea MBE MA (b. 1897 r. 1934-1967). Rea was an Anglo-Papalist who did much work to maintain dialogue between the Anglican and Roman churches. Rea was a member of the Confraternity of Unity, of which he was appointed Canon Secretary. He became a personal friend of Pope John XXIII, and Pope Pius XII who consecrated the stone mensa-slab (altar-stone) which is set into the High Altar of Eye Church.

Here is a summary of the development of this Church over many years of the 19th and 20th Centuries: This booklet, ('The Parish Church of St Peter and St Paul, Eye, Suffolk') was designed and written by church members to be made available to visitors to the church, and any others who are interested in its history.

== Present day ==
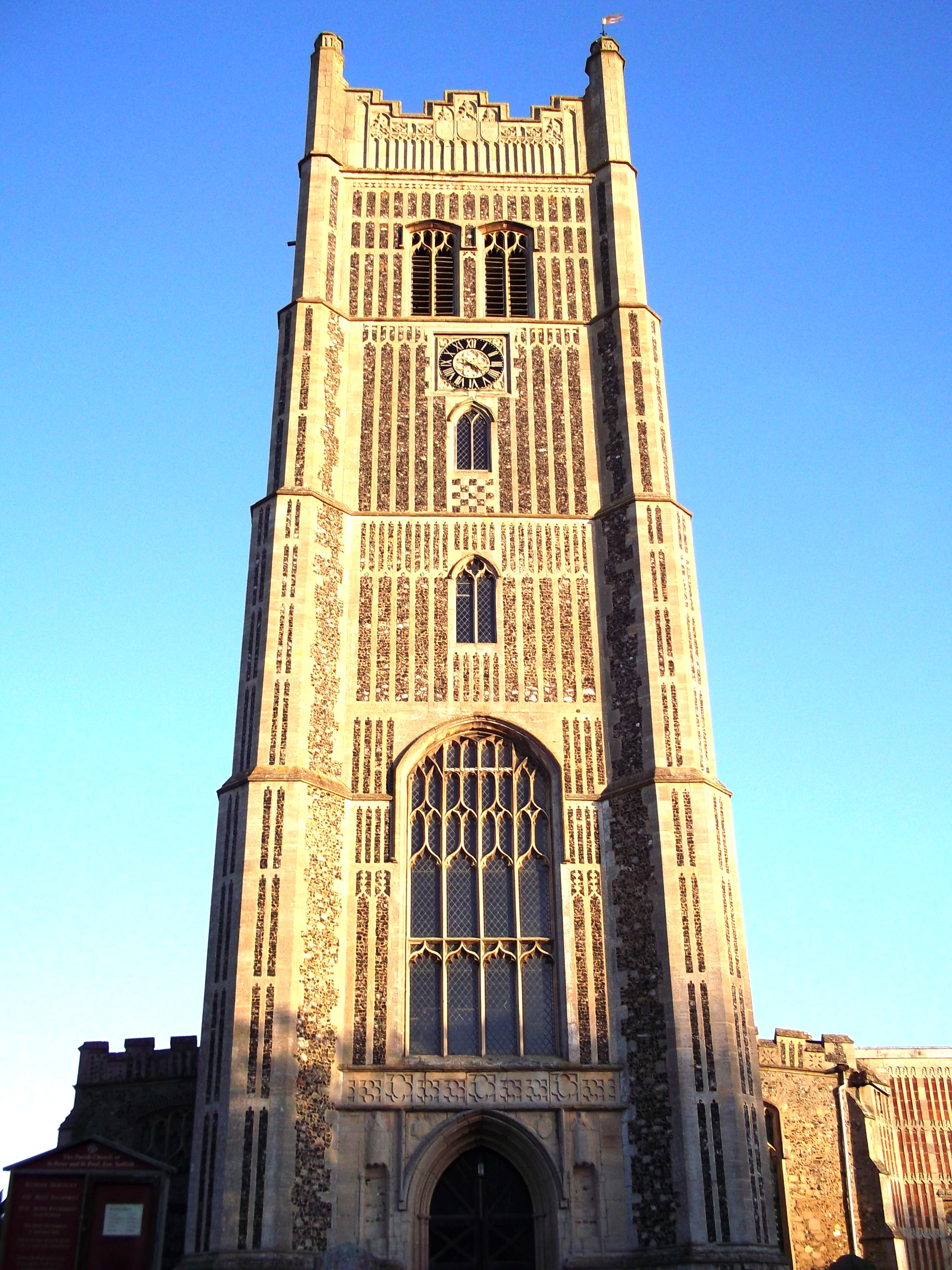
The Church tower

Today, the church continues to uphold this tradition of Anglo-Catholicism with the Sacraments being central to the worship. Sung Mass (Latin: Missa cantata) is celebrated each Sunday with High Mass (aka Solemn Mass) (Latin: Missa solemnis) on major feast days. Low mass (Latin: Missa Privata) is celebrated mid-week.

The tradition of music also continues with an adult choir and to the accompaniment of a Binns organ. The organ builder was James Jepson Binns. The instrument was built in 1888 - originally installed at St Mark Church, Woodhouse, Leeds. and re-built at Eye in 2014/15 by E. J. Johnson and Son (Cambridge) Ltd

The Rector is the Rev'd Dr Guy Sumpter who serves the parish as a priest of “The Society” under the patronage of St Wilfrid and St Hilda. An objective of "The Society" is to promote and maintain catholic teaching and practice within the Church of England.Fr Guy will retire on 2nd November 2026.

"For the last 150 years or so Eye Church has embraced and upheld the Anglo-catholic tradition of the Church of England in worship, in teaching and in belief and worship."

Ss Peter & Paul is a member of Forward in Faith (FiF), an organisation operating in the Church of England and the Scottish Episcopal Church. FiF represents a traditionalist strand of Anglo-Catholicism and is characterised by its opposition to the ordination of women to the priesthood and episcopate. It also takes a traditionalist line on other matters of doctrine. The Church is under the Alternative Episcopal Oversight of the Bishop of Richborough.

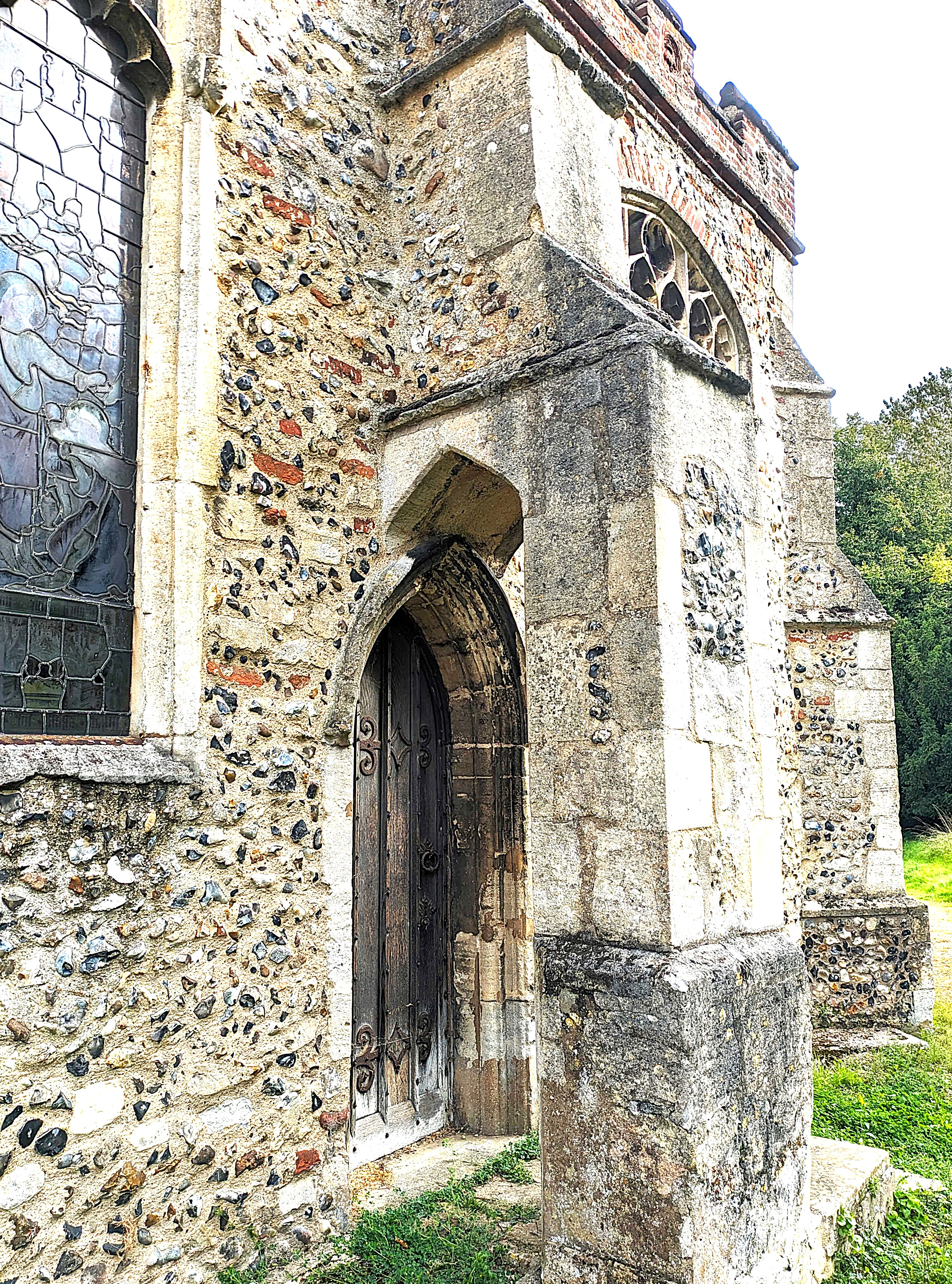
Priest's door under flying buttress (south side Chancel)

== Eye benefice ==
Eye Church is a constituent part of the Benefice of three churches:

- Ss Peter & Paul, Eye
- St Michael and All Angels Church, Occold
- St Mary, Bedingfield

Braiseworth

In 1975, the Parish Church of St Mary, Braiseworth closed and the pastoral care of that parish was incorporated within the parish of Eye. The official name of the combined parish is now 'Eye with Braiseworth'. The former church building (consecrated in 1857) is now a residential property. This church (referred to as the 'new' church) replaced a medieval building (the 'old' church), also dedicated to St Mary, which was partially demolished in 1857. All that remains of it is the chancel and surrounding graveyard.

== See also ==
- List of Anglo-Catholic churches in England
- Category:Listed churches in Suffolk
- Grade I listed buildings in Suffolk
- Eye, Suffolk
