= Eye Branch =

Former UK branch line

The Eye Branch was a 2 miles 72 chains (2.90 miles, 4.67 km) long single track branch railway line in Suffolk, England that ran from Mellis railway station on the Great Eastern Main Line to Eye via one intermediate station, Yaxley Halt. It was the shortest railway branch line in East Anglia to enjoy a regular passenger service.

== History ==
As early as the 1820s various railway schemes were planned to serve the town of Eye. In the 1840s, the town leaders of Eye lobbied to have a station on the main line, but when the main line from Ipswich to Norwich opened in 1849 it ran three miles to the west of the town and the provision of the station at Mellis railway station was "built to afford a communication with the neighbouring town of Eye". The station at Mellis was proposed by the Ipswich and Bury Railway as part of their route to Norwich. Such were the changes in the railway industry that in 1847 the Ipswich and Bury Railway became part of the Eastern Union Railway who started operating service between Haughley and Burston on 2 July 1849. This railway became part of the Great Eastern Railway in 1862.

Mellis and Eye Railway Act 1865
- Act of Parliament
- Parliament of the United Kingdom
- Long title: An Act for authorizing the Construction of a Railway from the Great Eastern Railway at Mellis to Eye in the County of Suffolk; and for other Purposes.
- Citation: 28 & 29 Vict. c. ccxlix

Dates
- Royal assent: 5 July 1865

Text of statute as originally enacted

It was not until 30 November 1864 a bill for an act of Parliament was deposited for the building of the railway from Mellis to Eye. This passed into law as the Mellis and Eye Railway Act 1865 (28 & 29 Vict. c. ccxlix) on 5 July 1865 and the Mellis and Eye Railway (M&ER) started construction soon after.

The first special train ran on 10 December 1866 but it was not until 8 February 1867 that the Board of Trade inspected the line (the delay being as a result of bad weather). Regular passenger services did not begin until 2 April 1867 as the independent company negotiated with the Great Eastern Railway (GER) who supplied rolling stock to run the line. Eventually a deal was struck where the GER took 50% of the gross receipts in return for operating the line for ten years.

The GER exploited the fact the small company could not afford its own locomotives and rolling stock and in fact increased its take to 60% of gross receipts in order to cover the costs of operating the line. By 1883 relations between the owning company and the GER improved and a dividend was paid. Freight traffic was good at this point and when the GER finally absorbed the original railway company under the Great Eastern Railway (General Powers) Act 1898 (61 & 62 Vict. c. lxvi) they paid face value for the shares.

In the early 1900s the population of Eye declined, two firms that generated significant goods traffic for the line went out of business and the opening of the Mid-Suffolk Light Railway led to a further decline in freight services. The First World War saw an upturn in traffic as increased local produce was sent to towns and cities as there was a shortage of imported food.

The only intermediate halt on the line – Yaxley Halt railway station – was opened on 20 December 1922.

In 1923 the GER became part of the London and North Eastern Railway. The following year a seven-day strike saw a decline in the lines goods traffic. The General Strike of 1926 saw the passenger service suspended as coal stocks ran low although later on in the strike, two trains per day were reinstated.

The improvement to roads and rural bus services in the 1920s resulted in the line closing to passengers on 2 February 1931. The engine shed closed shortly afterwards and the outbased locomotive returned to Ipswich engine shed, the signals were removed and some staff transferred away. Throughout the rest of the 1930s the goods traffic was dealt with two trains per day.

During the Second World War the branch acted as a railhead for a number of airfields. The station was attacked during the war by a Stuka divebomber but little damage was done.

In 1948 the branch became part of British Railways (Eastern region). Goods traffic continued to decline throughout the 1950s with trains being formed of two or three wagons. In 1956 the branch was served by the 3:15 pm Norwich to Stowmarket goods train which reversed at Mellis. On 30 September 1956 the "Suffolk Venturer Railtour" visited the branch.

The line closed completely on 13 July 1964 and was dismantled the following May.

In 1980 railway historian, Peter Paye released his book on the branch called The Mellis and Eye Railway. Numerous further edition have been published since the original 1980 edition.

== Locomotives ==
The following locomotive classes are known to have worked the line (all those in the table are steam locomotives):

GER classification	LNE classification	Wheel Arrangement	Notes
-	-	2-2-2T	Former Eastern Union Railway locomotives which worked first trains on branch. Withdrawn by 1871.
-	-	2-2-0T	Former Eastern Counties Railway locomotive which worked trains on branch from 1867 - 1872.
B	-	2-2-2WT	Former Eastern Union Railway locomotives designed by Daniel Gooch. Worked branch in early 1870s.
T7	-	0-4-2T	Introduced 1871/2 all withdrawn between 1890 and 1892. Worked branch 1870s and 1880s.
K9	-	0-4-2T	Worked branch in 1880s and 1890s - all withdrawn by 1905
E22	J65	0-6-0T	Worked almost all branch services 1893 - 1931
Y65	F4	2-4-2T	Two examples worked the branch (in 1931 and 1938) with the intention of replacing the E22 class but they did not prove a success and were re-allocated.
417	-	0-6-0	Special Goods workings - all withdrawn by 1899
477	-	0-6-0	Special Goods workings - all withdrawn by 1902
Y14	J15	0-6-0	Goods - these locomotives worked most trains after the withdrawal of passenger services in 1931.
G58	J17	0-6-0	Heavier goods locomotive that first worked services in LNER days and into British Rail days
T26	E4	2-4-0	Excursions and special trains. Occasional goods workings but not regular visitors to line.

Note locomotives withdrawn prior to 1923 did not receive a LNER classification.

The following diesel locomotives worked the line (all on goods services) from the late 1950s until closure.

- British Rail Class 15
- British Rail Class 21
- British Rail Class 24
- British Rail Class 31

== The route described ==
The branch began at Mellis station and branch services terminated in a platform that curved eastwards away from the main line. There were a number of loop sidings here for goods traffic and run round of train locomotives. The line fell on a 1 in 870 gradient passing through agricultural land. A number of minor roads and tracks crossed the track on the level. Around 1 mile 23 chains there was a shallow cutting and the line was rising for a short distance on a 1 in 293 gradient before falling at a 1 in 121 gradient to Yaxley Halt situated 1 mile 40 chains. The only over bridge on the line was located here carrying the Ipswich to Norwich Road over the line. After the stop at Yaxley, trains would have been in a shallow cutting as the village of Eye came into view. At 1 mile 49 chains the gradient changed to 1 in 1320 rising and the line was a short embankment.

The line continued through agricultural land before passing over a stream underbridge and terminating at Eye station at 2 miles and 72½ chains. The goods yard sidings were to the north side of the line. Opposite the station was the small engine shed and water tower.

All measurements from the junction at Mellis.
