= River Dove, Suffolk =

River in Suffolk, England

Dove
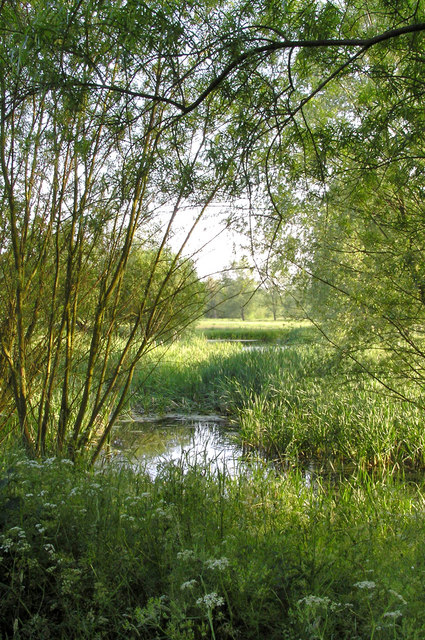
- The River Dove, near to Thornham Magna

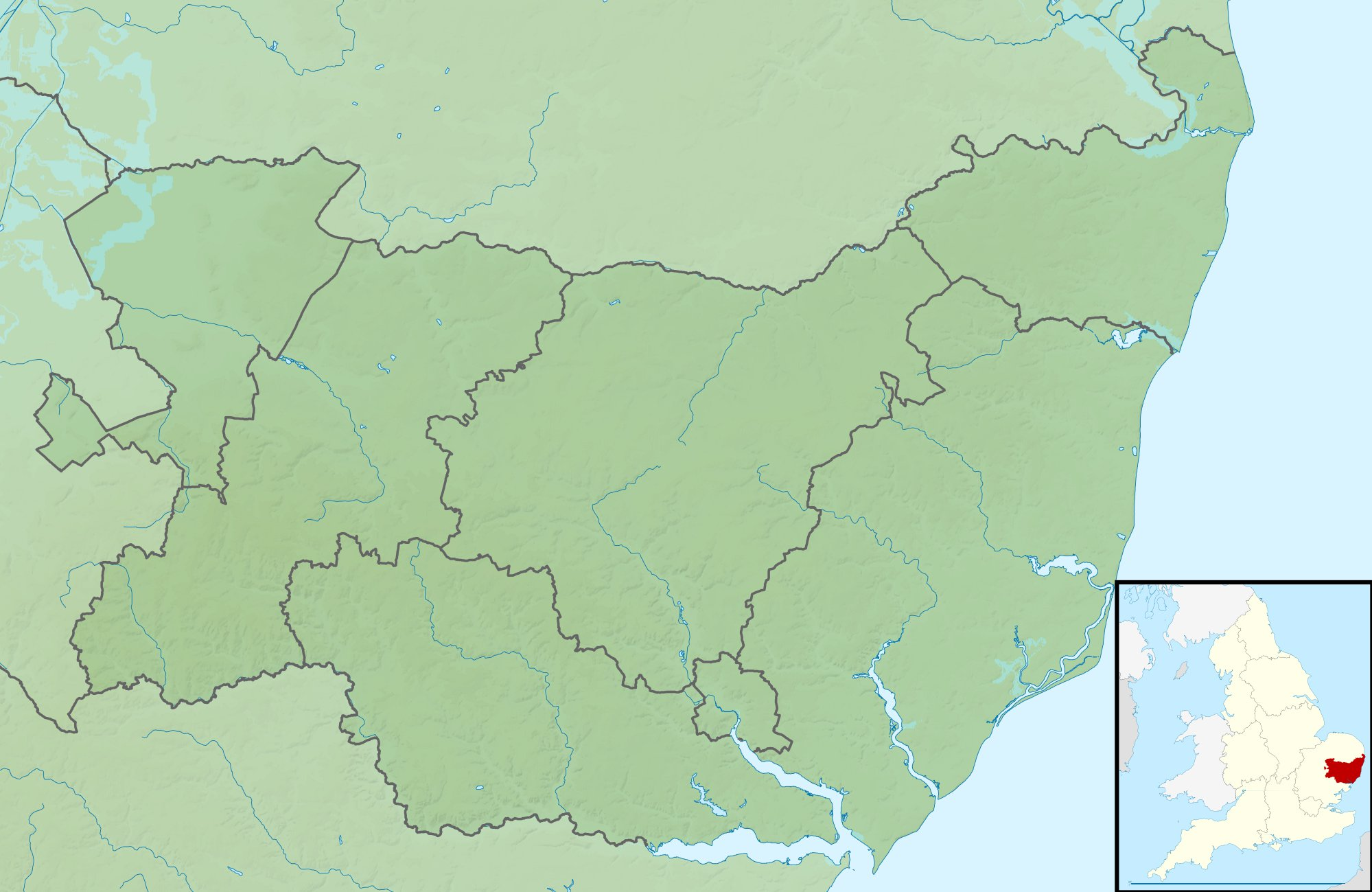
- Location within Suffolk

Location
- Country: England
- Region: Suffolk

Physical characteristics
- Source: Bacton
  - coordinates: 52.2559°N 1.001°E
  - elevation: 63 m (207 ft)
- Mouth: River Waveney near Hoxne
  - coordinates: 52.3606°N 1.19685°E
  - elevation: 22 m (72 ft)
- Length: 24.5 km (15.2 mi)

Basin features
- River system: River Waveney
- Tributaries
  - right: Gold Brook

The River Dove is a river in the county of Suffolk. It is a tributary of the River Waveney starting near Bacton going through Eye to the Waveney.

== Course ==
The Dove rises as several minor streams in the parish of Bacton at around 63 metres above sea level. It descends to the west of the village and flows north, before turning east to pass through the village of Finningham where it passes under the Stowmarket to Norwich railway. At Thorndon it merges with another stream and its course turns north. The river then skirts the eastern edge of the village of Eye, running alongside the former Eye Priory.

Below Eye, it largely forms the western boundary of the parish of Hoxne in a meandering course to the west of Hoxne village. Here it is joined by Gold Brook, before emptying into the River Waveney at the county boundary with Norfolk.

== Gold Brook ==
The stream known as Gold Brook flows around 8 kilometres (5.0 mi) north from the parish of Southolt through Redlingfield to Hoxne before emptying into the River Dove. As it enters Hoxne it is crossed by Goldbrook Bridge on the road to Cross Street. It is here that, according to legend, King Edmund the Martyr hid from the invading Danes. Whilst hiding under the bridge, a newly-wed couple saw his spurs glistening in the light and after capture by the Danes supposedly placed a curse on all bridal couples who should cross the bridge. Even up to the 19th century it is said that wedding parties would avoid the bridge rather than take the risk. According to the same legend, Edmund was then killed on the hill above the bridge.

== History ==
The river passes alongside the town of Eye, known for its important medieval castle. The name "Eye" is believed to derive from an old word for "island", as in medieval times the River Dove, its tributaries and marshland would frequently flood and render it effectively an island. The area around the river still floods frequently.

The river is the subject of a 1909 work by Alfred Munnings entitled A Suffolk Pastoral, the River Dove with a distant clover field.
