= Eye railway station =

Disused railway station in Suffolk, England

Coordinates: 52.3206°N 1.1423°E

Eye
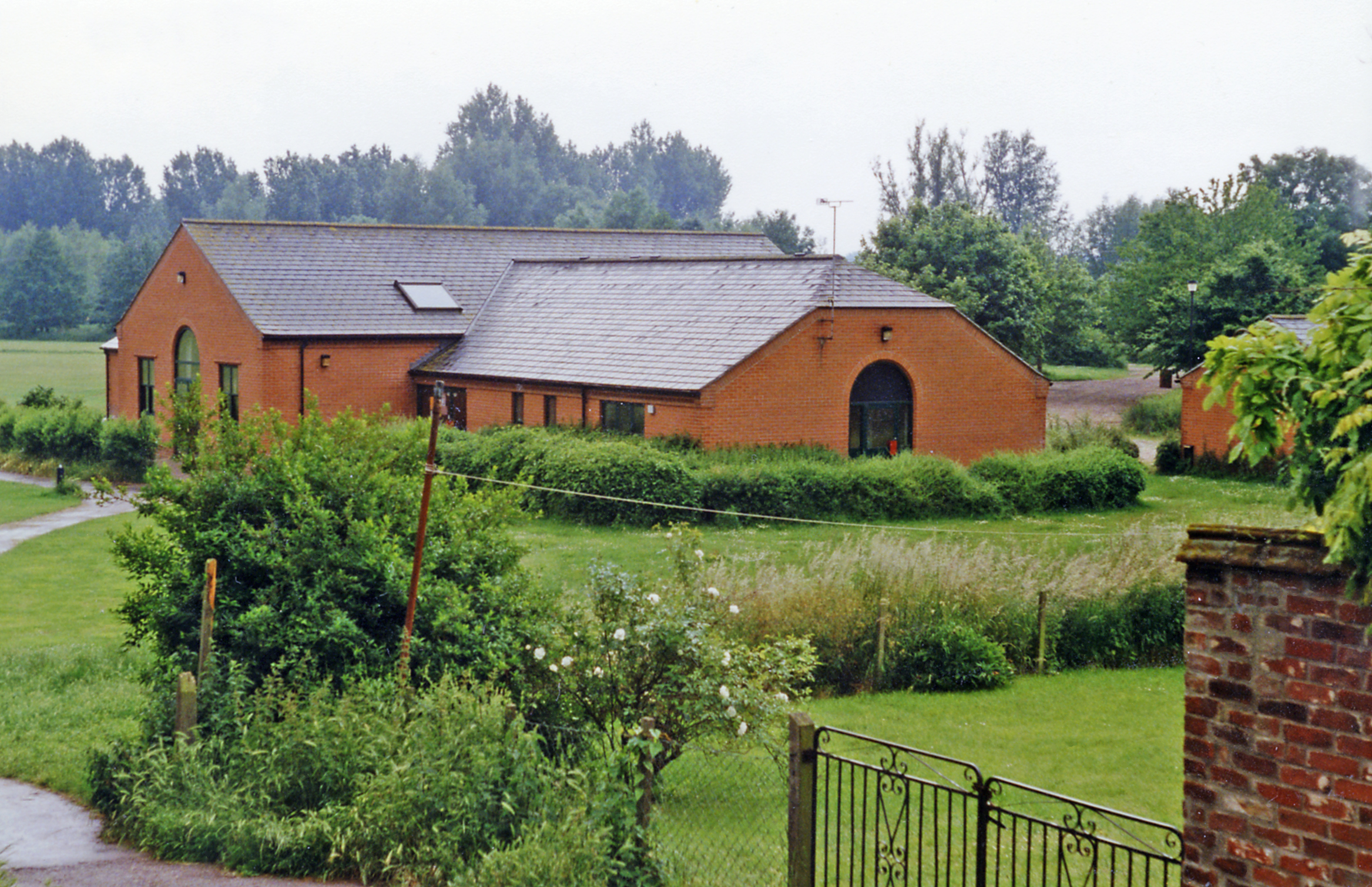
- Site of the station (1997)

General information
- Location: Eye, Mid Suffolk; England
- Platforms: 1

Other information
- Status: Disused

History
- Original company: Mellis and Eye Railway
- Pre-grouping: Great Eastern Railway
- Post-grouping: London and North Eastern Railway

Key dates
- 2 Apr 1867: Opened
- 2 Feb 1931: Closed for passengers
- 13 July 1964: Closed for freight
Location

Eye railway station was located in Eye, Suffolk on a branch from Mellis. It was 94 miles 24 chains (151.8 km) down-line from London Liverpool Street. It was closed to passengers on 2 February 1931 and to goods on 13 July 1964.

Former Services

Preceding station	Disused railways	Following station
Yaxley Halt	Great Eastern Railway; Eye Branch	Terminus

In the 1840s, the town leaders of Eye unsuccessfully lobbied to have the new main line from London to Norwich run through Eye – instead, the line was routed through nearby Diss, which had an enormous effect on the prosperity and growth of that town. Eye got its own station on a later branch line, of much less importance, opening some time later.
