= Finningham railway station =

Disused railway station in Suffolk, England

Coordinates: 52.2689°N 1.0207°E

Finningham
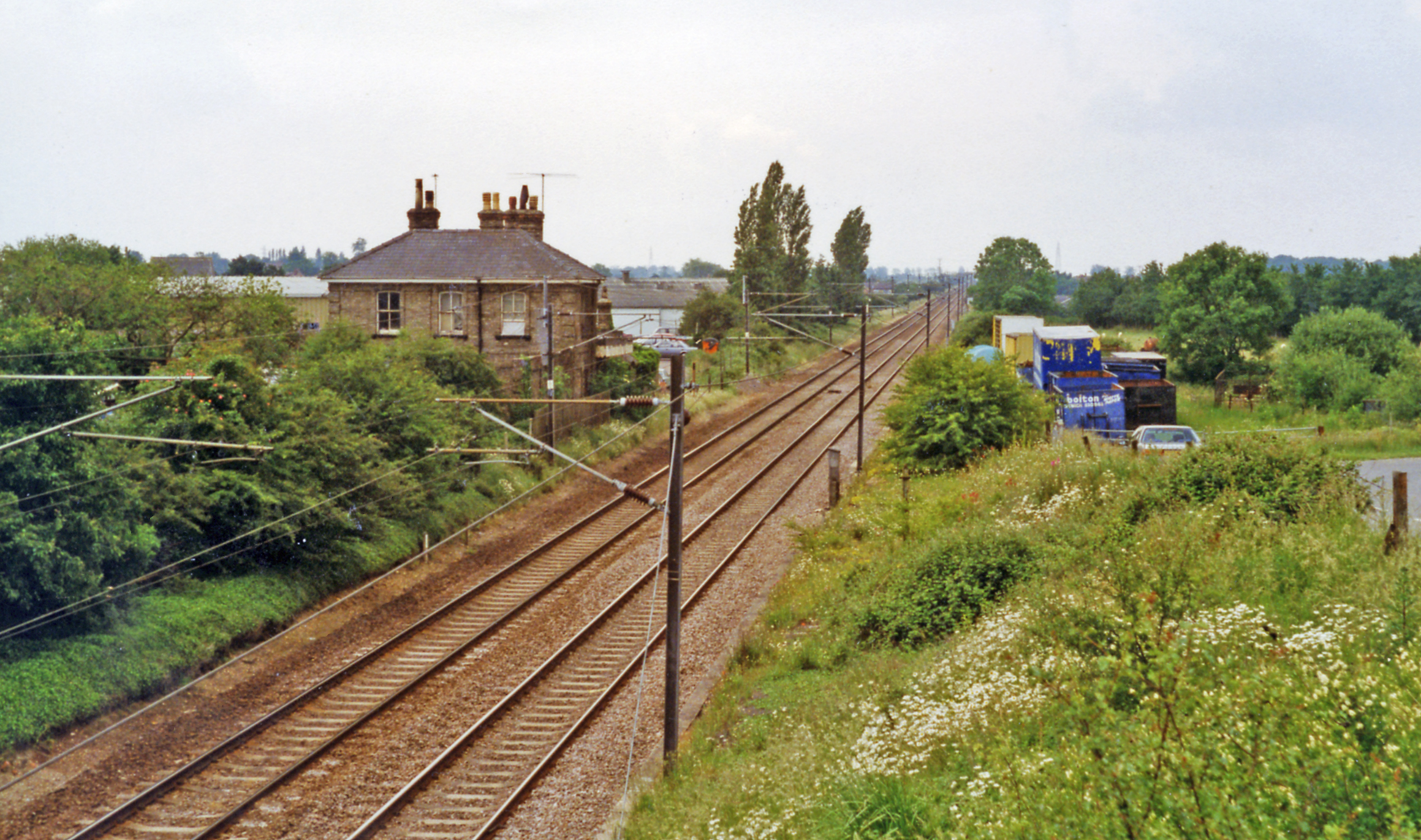
- The site of the station in 1997

General information
- Location: Bacton, District of Mid Suffolk; England
- Platforms: 2

Other information
- Status: Disused

History
- Original company: Eastern Union Railway
- Pre-grouping: Great Eastern Railway
- Post-grouping: London and North Eastern Railway

Key dates
- 7 June 1848: open for goods traffic
- 28 May 1849: open for passengers
- 7 November 1966: Station closed
Location

Finningham railway station was a station physically located in the neighbouring parish of Bacton, Suffolk on the Great Eastern Main Line between London and Norwich. It was located 86 miles 54 chains (139.5 km) from Liverpool Street and was opened to passenger in 1849. It was closed in 1966 as part of the Beeching Axe with other smaller stations on the line although the line remains open.

== Early history ==
Work on the extension of the Ipswich to Bury St Edmunds Railway line from Haughley Junction towards Norwich commenced in early 1848 by the Eastern Union Railway (EUR). A single track railway opened as far as Finningham on 7 June 1848 which was for goods traffic only. Extension towards Diss and Norwich was difficult due to the challenges presented by Thrandeston bog and the line to Diss opened 28 May 1849. Six months later on 11 November 1849 the line opened through to Norwich with a second track.

The EUR, who were short of money, decided to only erect temporary buildings at Finningham to see whether passenger traffic would develop to justify more permanent buildings. Operation of the EUR was taken over by the Eastern Counties Railway in 1854 and following a financially difficult period almost all of the railways in East Anglia were merged into a single operation called the Great Eastern Railway (GER). Following gales in the winter of 1863 which destroyed the temporary buildings, the GER approved and built a substantial station building in 1865.

In 1881 the line was fitted with Absolute Block signalling.

From February 1895 to July 1898 the station master was Robert Gillingwater (1854-1923)

Between 1923 and 1947 the station was operated by the London and North Eastern Railway.

== Description ==
Around 1900 Finningham station had two platforms joined by a footbridge, a small goods shed and cattle pens on the up side (East side) of the line and a loop and sidings on the down side. A siding located a short distance to the south on the up side also handled grain traffic.

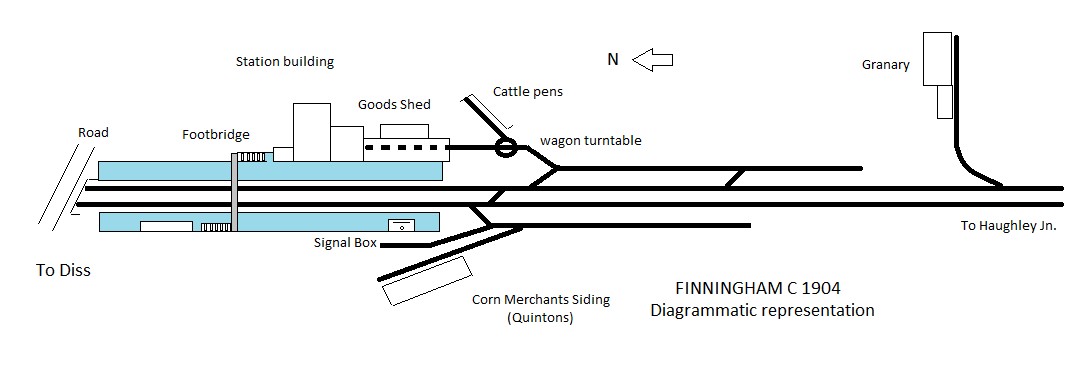
Sketch of Finningham station track layout c 1904

The signal box, which had 18 levers for points and signals, was situated at the south end of the down platform more or less opposite the main station building which was just to the north of the goods shed. There was a small brick built shelter on the down side for Norwich bound passengers.

== Closure ==
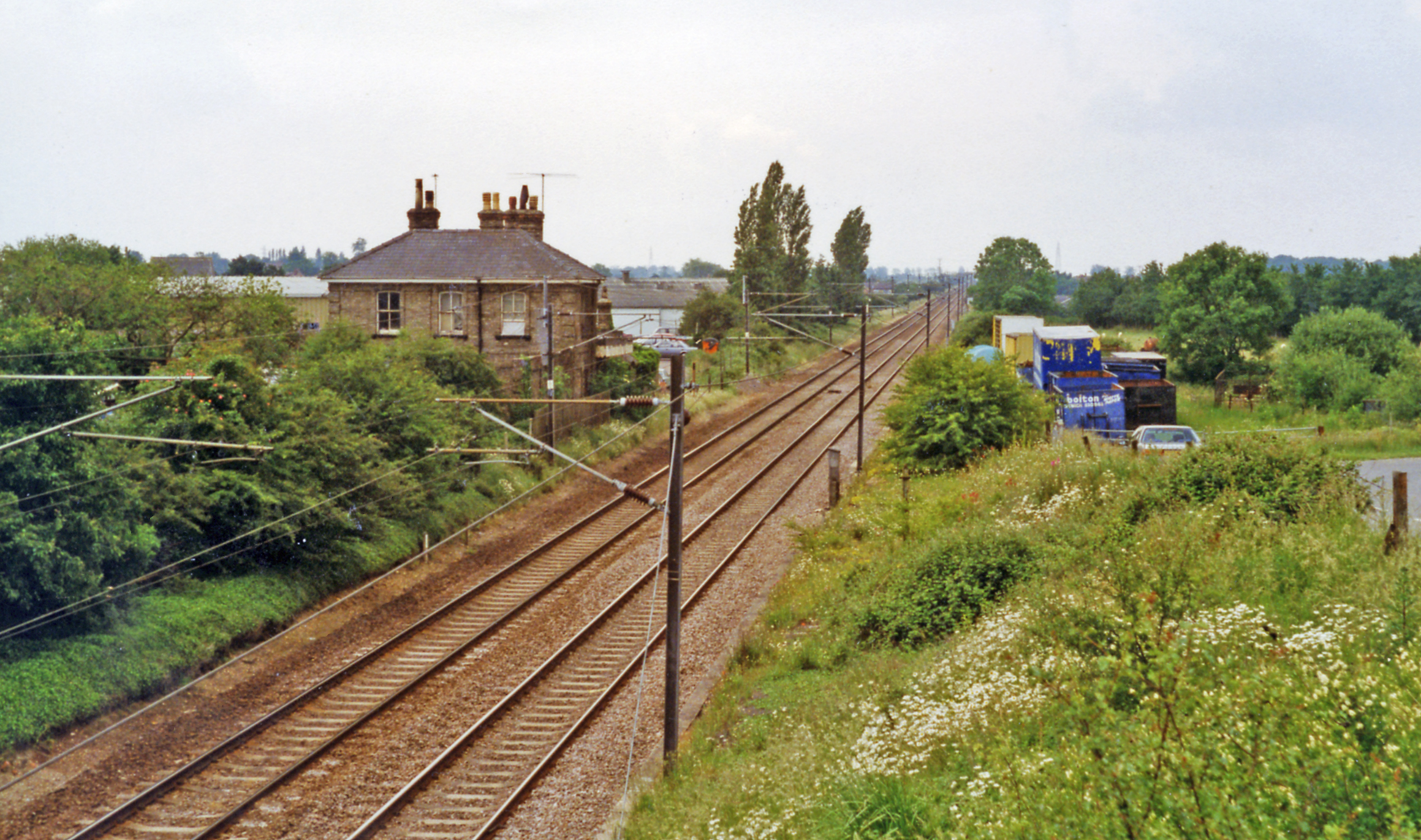
Finningham station site

Following nationalisation in 1948 Finningham station became part of British Railways Eastern Region.

Freight, which for many years during the 1950s consisted of a daily pick-up freight train between Norwich and Stowmarket, was finally withdrawn on 28 December 1964 and the goods sidings were all lifted the following year on 15 July 1965. The connections to the goods loops lasted until 5 June 1968 when the last points were removed and the signal box abolished.

The last passenger trains called on 5 November 1966 when the Ipswich to Norwich stopping service was withdrawn.

The line to Norwich remains in operational use and was electrified in May 1987.

== Timetables ==
=== 1851 ===
In the March 1850 Bradshaws Guide Finningham appears on page 33 and on weekdays has two up services at 0830 to Colchester with a connection via the Eastern Counties Railway to Liverpool Street at 12:50pm. The other service departed at 06:50 pm. calling all stations.

Finningham enjoyed a slightly better service towards Norwich with trains at 9:00 am, 12:55 pm and 7:18 pm. Journey time to Norwich calling all stations (except Swainsthorpe which had not opened) was 1 hour 20 minutes and to Ipswich 1 hour.

=== July 1922 ===
The Bradshaws guide for July 1922 shows the trains serving Finningham in the last summer before the big four grouping the following January. Services to Finningham appeared on tables 274 to 277.

During the week in the up direction towards Ipswich and London the first service to call at Finningham was the 7:53 am to Ipswich with the next service at 11:33 am to Liverpool Street. There were three train sn the afternoon with the last train - the 7:02 pm Norwich to Liverpool Street train calling at 08:10 pm. There was a single up service on Sunday which called at 8:22 am

On weekdays in the down direction towards Norwich the first service was at 7:33 am and the last at 8:03 pm with four other services throughout the day. Three of these originated from London Liverpool Street with the other three starting from Norwich. On Sunday there were two trains towards Norwich.

=== Winter 1964 ===
In the 7 September 1964 – 13 June 1965 British Railways Eastern Region public timetable, Finningham appeared in table 3. Along with the two neighbouring stations of Haughley and Mellis, Finningham was marked with an asterisk denoting "These stations may be closed during the currency of the timetable and in this event an appropriate notice will be given".

Despite this, the 05:43 Lowestoft – Norwich - London Liverpool Street, actually called at Finningham at 07:01. The other up morning services at 7:28 and 8:38 and 10:38 terminated at Ipswich (journey time about 30 minutes). In the afternoon the service was more or less two hourly until 8:39 although an 11:39 operated on Saturdays only.

In the down direction the first service to call at Finningham (at 07:35) was the 04:30 am. Liverpool Street – Norwich - Yarmouth Vauxhall. This was followed by the 8:58 limited stop service to Norwich and then a gap until 1:08 in the afternoon. The next train was the 4:19 pm. service from Stowmarket to Norwich calling at 4:31 which offered a connection form the 2:30 Liverpool Street-Norwich at Stowmarket. The next Norwich service was an all stations service from Ipswich at 5:59 and 7:31, 9:27 and on Saturdays the 08:30 service from Liverpool Street called to set down only at 10:24.

There was no Sunday service.

Preceding station	Historical railways	Following station
Mellis; Line open, station closed	Great Eastern Railway; Ipswich, Bury and Norwich Railway	Haughley; Line open, station closed
