= Diss railway station =

Railway station in Norfolk, England

Diss
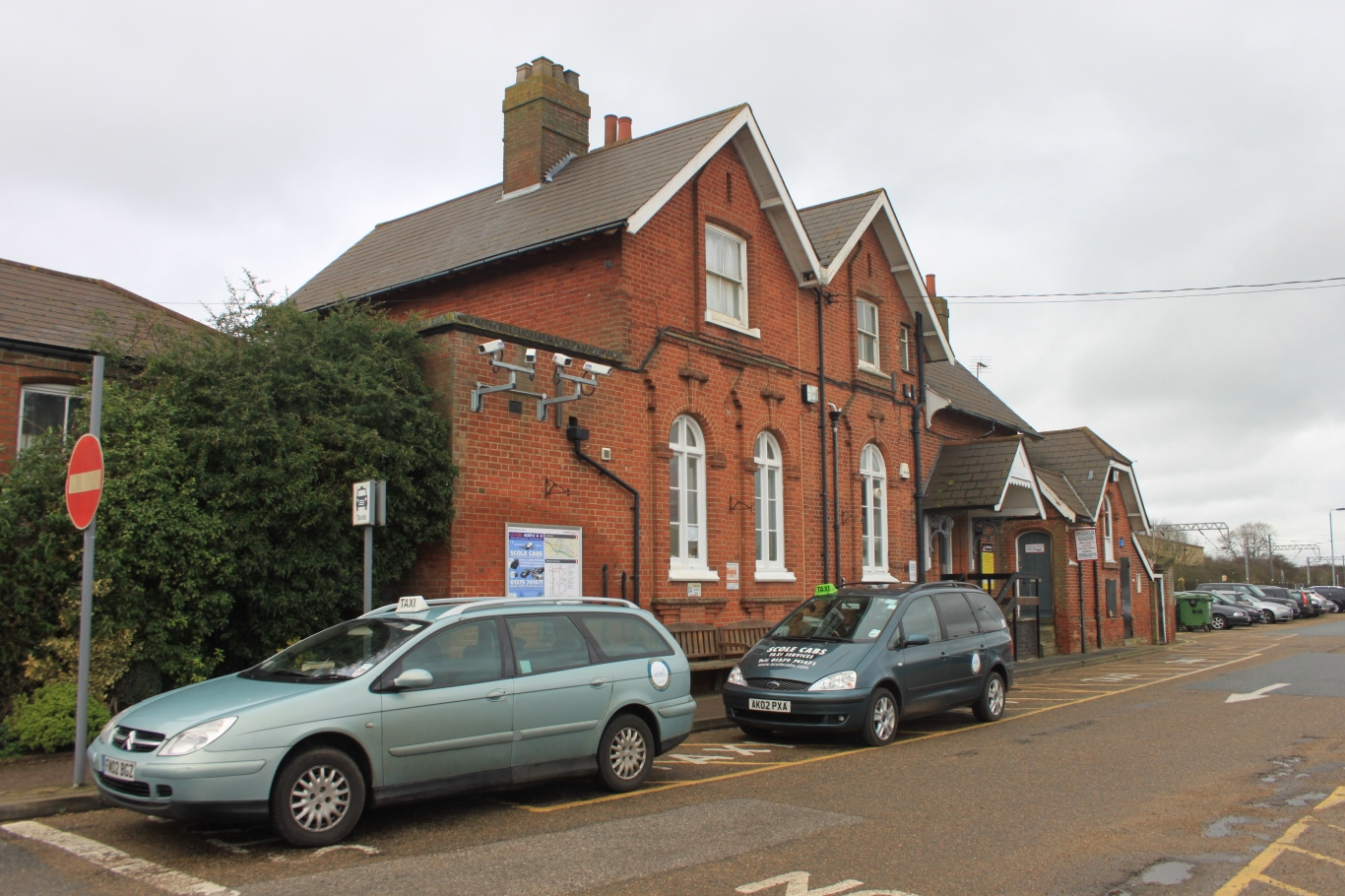

General information
- Location: Diss, South Norfolk, England
- Coordinates: 52.374°N 1.124°E
- Grid reference: TM127796
- Manager: Greater Anglia
- Platforms: 2

Other information
- Station code: DIS
- Classification: DfT category C2

Passengers
- 2020/21: ▼0.124 million
- 2021/22: ▲0.422 million
- 2022/23: ▲0.560 million
- 2023/24: ▲0.615 million
- 2024/25: ▲0.701 million
Location
Notes
- Passenger statistics from the Office of Rail and Road

Diss railway station serves the market town of Diss, in Norfolk, England. It lies on the Great Eastern Main Line, 94 miles 43 chains (152.1 km) down the line from London Liverpool Street and approximately 20 miles (32 km) south of Norwich. The station is currently operated by Greater Anglia, which also operate all trains serving it as part of the East Anglia franchise. Due to its location, it is the only station on the Greater Anglia network (and, by extension, one of the only stations in the UK) to be served exclusively by inter-city trains.

== History ==
The station at Diss was proposed by the Ipswich and Bury Railway, as part of their route to Norwich. Such were the changes in the railway industry that, in 1847, the Ipswich & Bury Railway became part of the Eastern Union Railway, which started operating in 1849. This became part of the Eastern Counties Railway (ECR) in 1854, which amalgamated with several other companies in 1862 to form the Great Eastern Railway (GER).

In 1873, there was an incident at Diss when a goods train and a passenger train collided in foggy conditions, injuring four passengers.

In 1883, a signal box was opened, possibly replacing an earlier structure.

From July 1898 to December 1915, the station master was Robert Gillingwater (1854–1923). He became a well-respected figure in the town and had a staff consisting of:

- 7 x clerks
- 2 x signalmen
- 2 x motor drivers
- 2 x horse shunters
- 2 x station foremen
- An unknown number of passenger and goods porters.

During the early part of the twentieth century, the goods yard was extended twice; during World War I, an Army Service Corps depot was established adjacent to the station.

Following the 1921 grouping, the GER amalgamated with other railways to form the London and North Eastern Railway (LNER).

On nationalisation in 1948, the station and its services came under the management of the Eastern Region of British Railways.

Some goods shunting at Diss was carried out by horses as late as 1959.

Between 1985 and 1987, the line through Diss was electrified by British Rail to the 25 kV overhead system. Electric locomotive-hauled InterCity services beyond Ipswich to Norwich commenced in 1987. At the same time, the signal box was closed as power-signalling was introduced to the area.

Following the privatisation of British Rail, the ownership of the tracks and station passed to Railtrack until 2002 and then to its successor Network Rail. During this period, the operation of the station and train services has been franchised to Anglia Railways (1997–2004), then to National Express East Anglia (2004–2012) and to Abellio Greater Anglia in 2012.

== Description ==
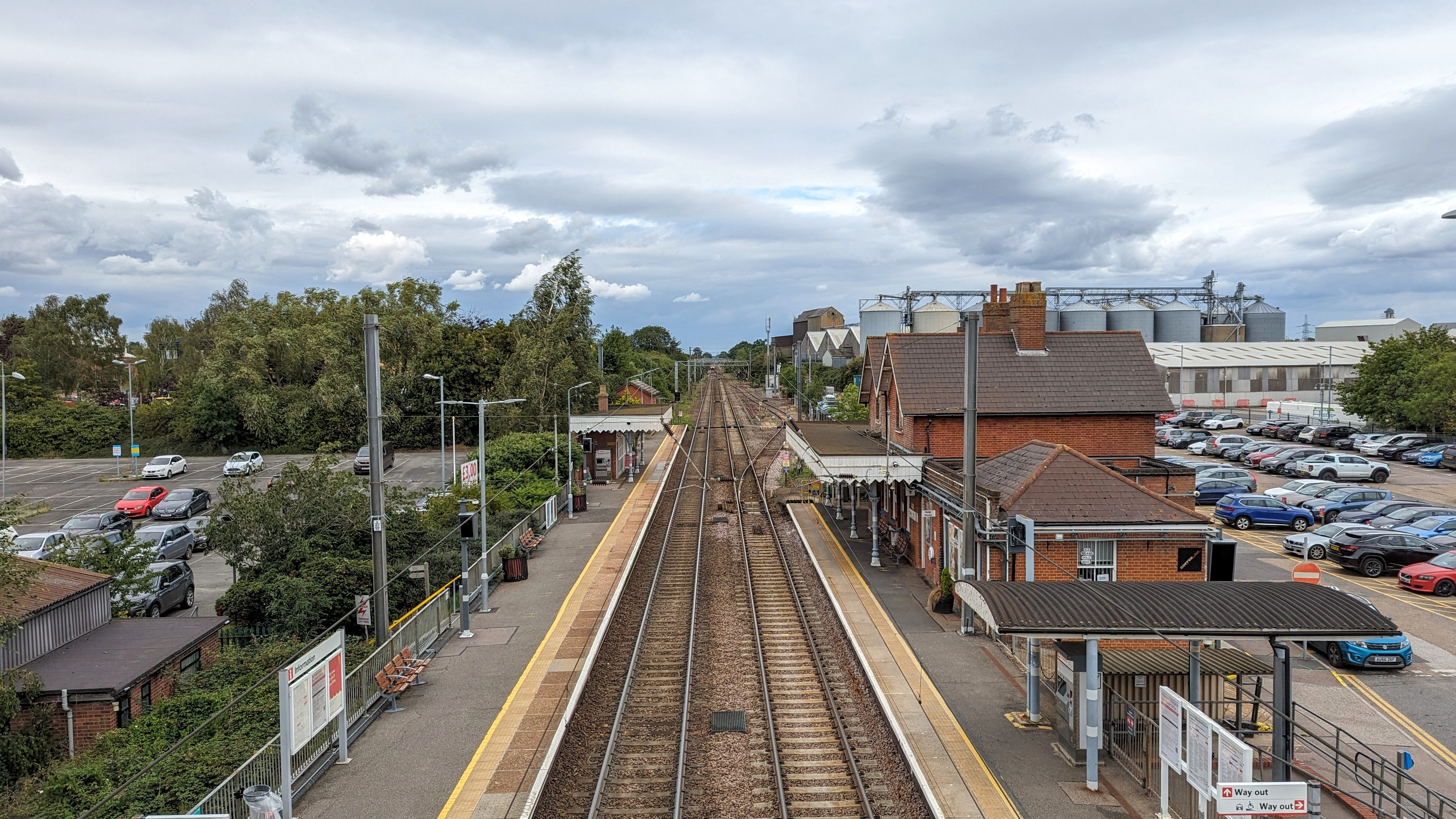
Looking northwards towards Norwich, 2023

A goods yard was located on the up (eastern) side of the line; it was equipped with a shed for the loading and unloading of goods, as well as cattle pens. it was an agricultural railway for William Betts' family at Frenze Hall, which extended for seven miles and had two engines.

The station has a waiting room on each platform and toilets on the up side (platform 1). It has a ticket office, with ticket machines on each platform. The old station master's house, which is part of the station and mostly the station's upstairs accommodation, is currently being used by one of the town's taxi companies.

== Services ==
Services at Diss are operated by Greater Anglia between London Liverpool Street, Colchester, Ipswich and Norwich; they call every 30 minutes in each direction.

Historically, a local stopping service also called at Diss, serving other stations such as Mellis, Burston and Tivetshall. This was withdrawn in 1966, when the smaller stations between Ipswich and Norwich were closed.

Preceding station	National Rail	Following station
Stowmarket	Greater Anglia Great Eastern Main Line	Norwich
Historical railways
Mellis	Great Eastern Railway Eastern Union Railway	Burston
Stowmarket	Anglia Railways London Crosslink	Norwich
