= Yaxley Halt railway station =

Disused railway station in Suffolk, England

Coordinates: 52.3241°N 1.1111°E

Yaxley Halt

General information
- Location: Yaxley, Mid Suffolk; England
- Platforms: 1

Other information
- Status: Disused

History
- Original company: Great Eastern Railway
- Pre-grouping: Great Eastern Railway
- Post-grouping: London and North Eastern Railway

Key dates
- 20 Dec 1922: Station opened
- 2 Feb 1931: Station closed
Location

Yaxley Halt railway station was located in Yaxley, Suffolk. It was midway along a branch line from Mellis to the terminus at Eye which opened in 1867. Yaxley Halt did not open until 20 December 1922 and closed in 1931 when passenger trains were withdrawn from the branch.

The station was situated adjacent to the Ipswich to Norwich main road (the A140) which passed over the railway at this point on a bridge known as the "Dukes Bridge". On inclement days passengers used to shelter under the bridge as the platform was a very basic affair with name board and oil lamp. Passenger trains carried a ladder by which passengers could board and alight.

Freight traffic continued on the Eye Branch until 1964 when the line closed. It was lifted in 1965.

The 1925 1:2500 map indicated a Roman coin was found on the line just to the east of the station.

Former services

Preceding station	Disused railways	Following station
Mellis	Great Eastern Railway; Eye Branch	Eye
