= Mellis railway station =

Disused railway station in Suffolk, England

Coordinates: 52.3291°N 1.0797°E

Mellis
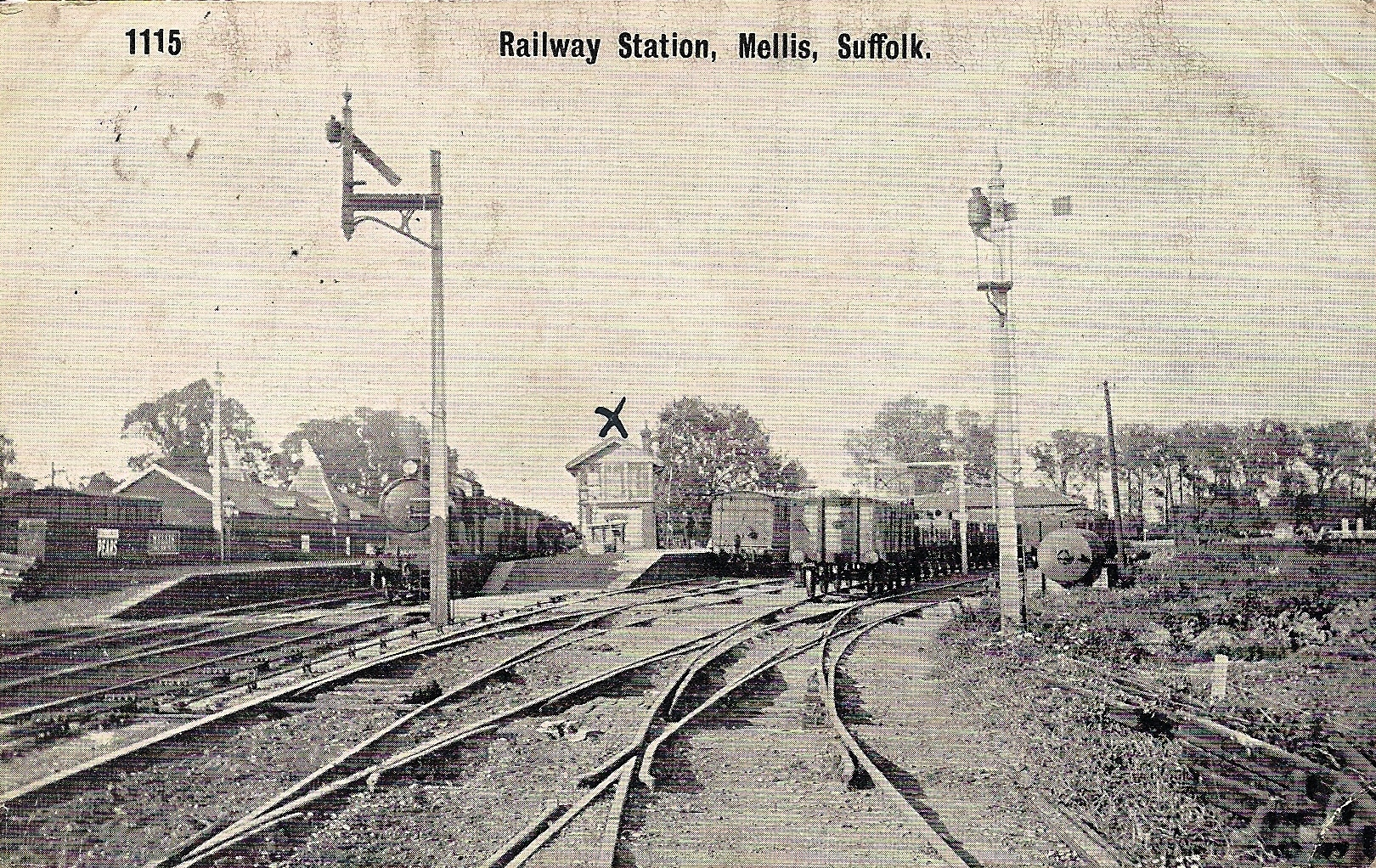
- Mellis railway station c 1900. The Eye branch is on the right as an up (towards Ipswich and London) train departs.

General information
- Location: Mellis, District of Mid Suffolk; England
- Grid reference: TM099745
- Platforms: 3

Other information
- Status: Disused

History
- Original company: Eastern Union Railway
- Pre-grouping: Great Eastern Railway
- Post-grouping: London and North Eastern Railway

Key dates
- 2 July 1849: Station opened
- 2 April 1867: Eye branch opened
- 7 November 1966: Station closed
Location

Mellis railway station was a station in Mellis, Suffolk, England. It was opened in 1849 by the Eastern Union Railway on the Great Eastern Main Line from London to Norwich. In 1867 the Eye Branch was opened and Mellis became a railway junction.

The branch line to Eye closed to passengers on 2 February 1931, but the line continued to serve goods traffic until the 1960s. Mellis was closed as part of the large-scale Beeching cuts on 7 November 1966, when local services between Ipswich and Norwich were withdrawn.

The line through Mellis was electrified in 1986, and carries regular passenger traffic between London's Liverpool Street station and Norwich.

== Opening ==
The station at Mellis was proposed by the Ipswich and Bury Railway as part of their route to Norwich. Such were the changes in the railway industry that in 1847 the Ipswich and Bury Railway became part of the Eastern Union Railway, which started operating service between Haughley and Burston on 2 July 1849.

The Eastern Union Railway became part of the Eastern Counties Railway in 1854, and was superseded itself by the Great Eastern Railway, which took over operation of the station in 1862.

== History ==
Mellis acted as a railhead for Eye, the only sizeable town in the area; a connecting horse omnibus ran for many years. By the 1860s the economic impact of not being on the railway network was being felt in Eye, and proposals for a branch line were realised with the Eye Branch opening in 1867.

The branch was served by a single platform that curved away from the main line; passenger trains to Eye started their journeys here. There were a number of goods sidings on this side of the station connected with the operation of the branch. A goods shed was built on the western side of the line, where a corn mill and maltings were also served by rail, in 1867. There were also livestock pens for cattle. Incoming traffic was largely domestic coal; outgoing traffic was mainly agricultural. Initially four main line trains called at Mellis per day (four up towards Ipswich and four down towards Norwich), but by 1863 this had increased to five. Three of these started from Bishopsgate railway station in London, the predecessor of Liverpool Street station, and the other two from Ipswich.

Before the First World War there were six trains per day; this continued until closure. Generally the Eye branch had four return services a day connecting with main line trains.

In 1923 the London and North Eastern Railway took over operation of the station. At this time a shunting horse was based at the station to shunt the goods yard and prepare goods trains for the Eye branch.

Passenger services on the Eye branch ceased on 2 February 1931.

In 1948, following nationalisation, the station and its services became part of the Eastern Region of British Railways.

== Closure ==
In July 1964 the Eye Branch was closed, and the station goods yard followed in December. During 1965 most of the track on the Eye Branch was lifted; some track work that remained on the down (western) side was removed in 1969.

Passenger services were withdrawn on 7 November 1966, although the station building itself was not demolished until 1975. During the mid-1980s the line was electrified and re-signalled with electric services to Norwich operating from June 1986. The signal box, built in 1883 to replace an earlier structure, and the remains of the platforms were demolished soon after.

Little remains of the station today, as of 2020 the most notable remains in the area are the former maltings (now a furniture shop), Robinson's mill (now apartments) and the foundations of Savill's corn mill on the north side of the crossing.

Preceding station	Historical railways	Following station
Diss; Line and station open	Great Eastern Railway; Main Line	Finningham; Line open, station closed
	Disused railways	
Terminus	Great Eastern Railway; Eye Branch	Yaxley Halt; Line and station closed
