= Eye, Suffolk =

Market town in Suffolk, England

Coordinates: 52°19′16″N 1°08′49″E

Eye
- Town and civil parish
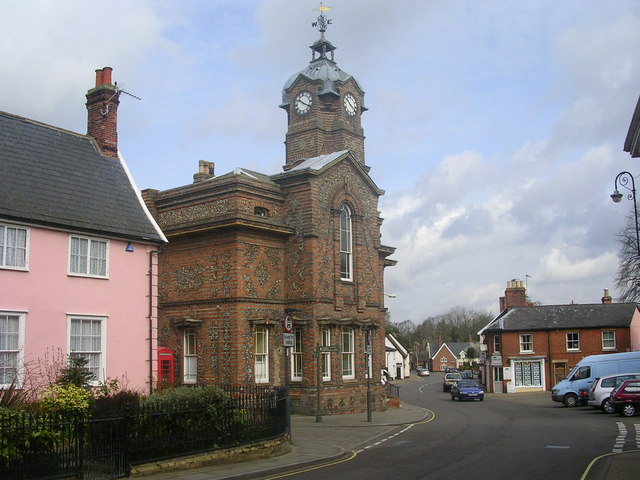
- Eye Town Hall

- Location within Suffolk
- Population: 2,210 (2021)
- OS grid reference: TM144739
- Civil parish: Eye
- District: Mid Suffolk
- Shire county: Suffolk
- Region: East
- Country: England
- Sovereign state: United Kingdom
- Post town: EYE
- Postcode district: IP23
- Dialling code: 01379
- Police: Suffolk
- Fire: Suffolk
- Ambulance: East of England
- UK Parliament: Waveney Valley

Eye (/ˈaɪ/) is a market town and civil parish in the Mid Suffolk district, in the north of the English county of Suffolk, about 4 miles (6 km) south of Diss, 17.5 miles (28 km) north of Ipswich and 23 miles (37 km) south-west of Norwich. The population in the 2011 census of 2,154 was estimated to be 2,361 in 2019 and updated to 2,210 following the 2021 census. It lies close to the River Waveney, which forms the border with Norfolk, and on the River Dove. Eye is twinned with the town of Pouzauges in the Vendée department of France.

== Etymology ==
The town of Eye derives its name from the Old English word for "island, land by water". It is thought that the first settlement on the site was almost surrounded by water and marshland formed by the Dove and its tributaries. The area remains prone to flooding close to the river.

== History ==
There have been Palaeolithic, Mesolithic, Neolithic and Bronze Age finds in and around Eye, but the earliest evidence of settlement dates from the Roman period. It includes buildings and coins from about 365 CE. A large Anglo-Saxon cemetery with many urned cremations and some furnished inhumations, in use in the 6th century, was excavated near the Waterloo Plantation in 1818.

In 1781 labourers unearthed a lead box by the river at Clint Farm in Eye, 3 miles (4.8 km) south of Scole and 2 miles (3.2 km) south–west of Hoxne. It contained some 600 Roman gold coins from the reigns of Valens and Valentinian I (reigned 364–375), Gratian (375–383), Theodosius I (378–395), Arcadius (395–408) and Honorius (393–423).

Eye before the Norman Conquest was one of numerous holdings of Edric of Laxfield, a wealthy, influential Saxon, who was the third largest landholder in Suffolk. After the Norman Conquest, the town's regional importance was confirmed when the Honour of Eye was granted to William Malet, a Norman lord.

In 1066–1071, Malet built a castle as his military and administrative headquarters and started a market that initiated the urbanisation of Eye. In 1086–1087, William's son Robert Malet, tenant-in-chief of the Honour of Eye in the hundred of Hartismere, founded Eye Priory.

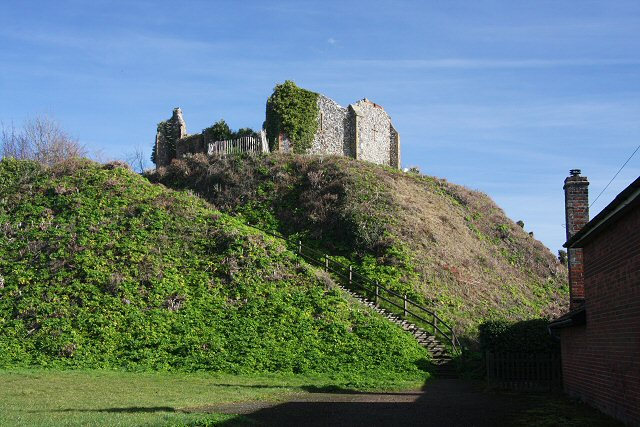
Eye Castle, a motte-and-bailey fortification

Eye began to lose its strategic importance after 1173 when the castle was attacked by Hugh Bigod, 1st Earl of Norfolk during a rebellion against Henry II, and later during the Second Barons' War of 1265, after which it never regained its former status. Its prison continued in use up until the early 17th century, despite a programme of demolishing most of the castle buildings in the 14th century. A windmill built in 1561–1562 stood on the motte until a circular mock keep was built there in 1844.

Eye was once the smallest borough in the country, its claim based on the 1205 Charter of King John. The charter was renewed in 1408, then by Elizabeth I in 1558 and 1574, by James I in 1604, and by William III in 1697. However, in 1885 the town clerk of Hythe proved that the original charter belonged only to Hythe in Kent, the error having arisen from the similarity of the early English names, the error was confirmed by archivists in the 1950s but borough status was not discontinued until 1974. In 1835 Eye became a municipal borough which became part of the administrative county of East Suffolk in 1889, the district contained the parish of Eye. On 1 April 1974 the district was abolished and became part of Mid Suffolk in the non-metropolitan county of Suffolk. A successor parish was formed covering the same area as the former district and its parish. Eye retained a Town Council, a Mayor and its insignia. From 1571 to 1832 Eye returned two Members of Parliament (MPs), then after the Reform Act 1832, a single MP until 1983, when the Eye Constituency became the Suffolk Central constituency.

The notable Cornwallis family was established at nearby Brome Hall in the 14th century. Individuals from the family, such as Charles Cornwallis, 1st Marquess Cornwallis, represented Suffolk county in the House of Commons over the next three hundred years.

The Lordship of the Manor of Eye (Sokemere) and Constableship of the Castle is held by the Palmer family of Haughley in Suffolk. The current Lord is Kieron Palmer of Haughley, succeeding his father Kenneth Palmer. The Manor was held by the Malet family in Norman times, Henry Earl of Brabant, the De Ufford, De la Pole, Cornwallis and Kerrison families as well as King Stephen, Edward I, Mary I and Thomas Beckett in previous years. Known as the Honour of Eye, it consisted of 129 manors and had the right to a court of pie poudre at its Whit Monday market fairs and those of Thrandeston and Finningham.

The earliest mention of industry in Eye records that in 1673 "the women's employ in this town is making of bone lace" and in 1830, "the humbler class of industrious females employ themselves in lace making." It would appear that Eye was at the centre of a localised lace-making industry for many years. In 1846 Eye Borough Council failed in its attempt to route the new London-Norwich railway line through Eye. The line, completed in 1849, went instead through Diss, which was ensured growth in prosperity and population, while the importance of Eye waned. Eye railway station, at the end of a branch line from Mellis, closed to passengers in 1931 and to freight in 1964.

Eye Airfield, to the north-east of the town, began as RAF Eye, occupied by the 490th Bomb Group of the USAAF's VIII Bomber Command during the Second World War.

== Ward ==
The electoral ward, through the Mid Suffolk District Council elections, elects councillors to the Mid Suffolk District Council.

=== Councillors ===
| Election | Member | Party |
|---|---|---|
| 2011 | Charles Flatman | Independent |
| 2015 | Charles Flatman | Independent |

=== 2011 Results ===
| Candidate name: | Party name: | Votes: | % of votes: |
|---|---|---|---|
| Flatman, Charles | Independent | 426 | 49.42 |
| Carr, Merlin | Green | 334 | 38.75 |
| Ede, Peter | Labour | 102 | 11.83 |

=== 2015 Results ===
The turnout of the election was 69.95%.

| Candidate name: | Party name: | Votes: | % of votes: |
|---|---|---|---|
| Charles FLATMAN | Independent | 639 | 54.62 |
| Simon HOOTON | Green Party | 531 | 45.38 |

== Services and amenities ==
Eye today has a population of just over 2000. Hartismere School provides secondary education and St Peter and St Paul CE Primary School primary education. It has a health centre, a library, a police station and a retained fire station. A community hospital opened in 2012, after a previous one closed in 2005.

The town's Guildhall is a Grade I listed building now converted into a private residence. Eye Town Hall, an imaginative and unorthodox building dating from 1856 and listed Grade II*, was designed by Edward Buckton Lamb.

== Church of St Peter and St Paul ==
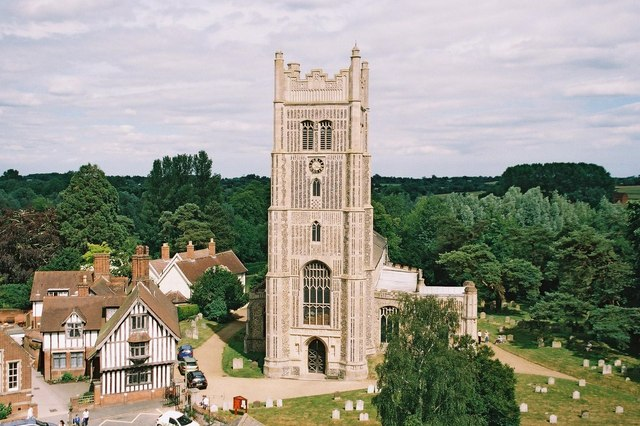
Parish church of Church of St Peter and St Paul

The Grade I listed Church of St Peter and St Paul from the 14th century is seen as one of the finest in the county.

A 13th-century Early English doorway was retained from an earlier building. The 15th and again the 16th century brought new work and renovation. This included installing an altar tomb to William Honnyng in the South or Lady Chapel and one to Nicholas Cutler to the north-west of the nave. The church was restored in 1868 by James Colling, a London architect. A notable added feature is a remarkable late 15th-century rood screen, with a loft and rood designed by Ninian Comper in 1925.

The tower of the church is 107 feet (33 metres) high to the tip of the pinnacles.

== Notable residents ==
In birth order:

- Spencer Compton, 1st Earl of Wilmington (1674–1743) MP for Eye, Speaker of the House of Commons from 1715 to 1727, went on to become the second Prime Minister from 1742 to 1743 after Robert Walpole.
- Rear-Admiral Sir Charles Cunningham (1755–1834) saw action in the American War of Independence and the French Revolutionary and Napoleonic Wars.
- Sir Edward Kerrison (1776–1853) MP for Eye and British army officer, saw action during the Battle of Waterloo.
- Concordia Merrel (1886–1962), actor and writer, lived and died in Eye.
- Sir Frederick Ashton (1904–1988), ballet dancer and Choreographer with The Royal Ballet, lived at Chandos Lodge in Eye, behind a local landmark known as the Crinkle Crackle Wall. He also lived in Yaxley, where he is buried alongside his sister.
- Cavendish Morton (1911–2015), artist, lived in Eye and was art therapist to Hartismere Hospital. He twice become Town Mayor. He exhibited from Stanley House in Eye, in 1977, two pictures: Waves-Aldeburgh and Breakers-Aldeburgh.
- Janet Frame (1924–2004), New Zealand author, rented a cottage at nearby Braiseworth for a period in 1963–1964, where she began a novel, An Adaptable Man, set in the local area. Eye is fictionalised as "Murston".
- Helen Fraser (1942–2026), actress, lived and died in Eye.
- Brian Capron (born 1947), actor, was born in Eye.
- Matthew Upson (born 1979), professional footballer, was born in Eye.
- Stuart O'Keefe (born 1991), professional footballer, was born in Eye.

== See also ==
- Eye (UK Parliament constituency)
