= Bacton, Suffolk =

Village in Suffolk, England

Coordinates: 52.26°N 01.00°E

Bacton
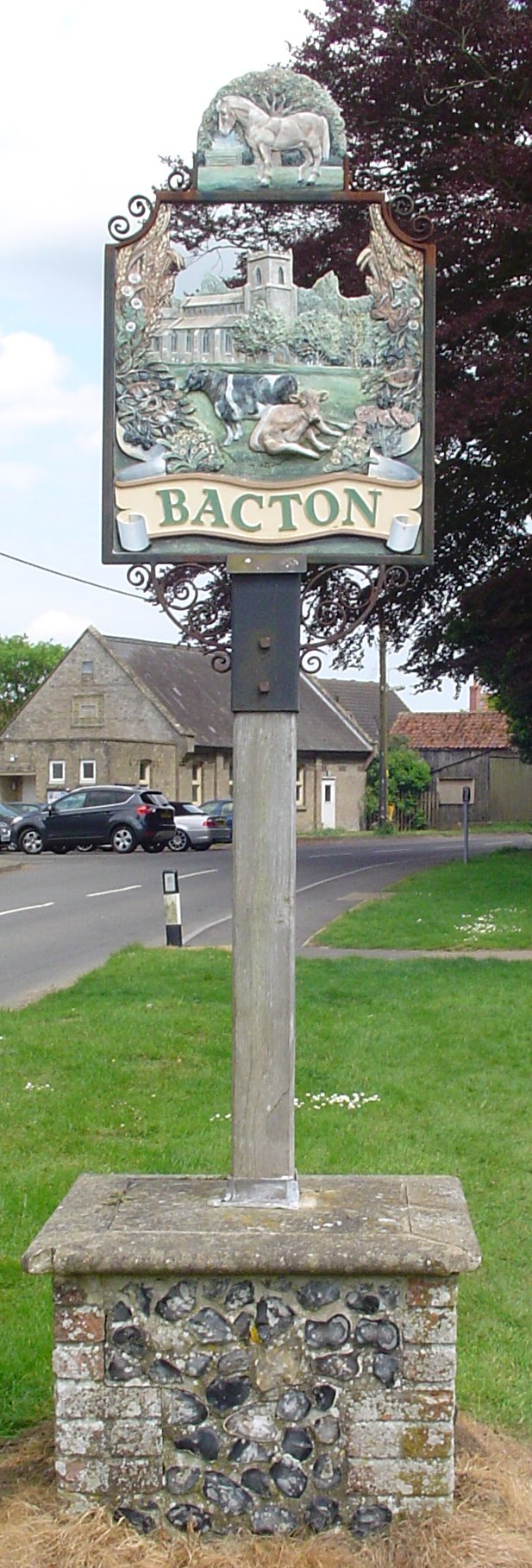
- Bacton village sign with Village Hall in background

- Location within Suffolk
- Interactive map of Bacton
- Population: 1,200 (2021)
- OS grid reference: TM0567
- District: Mid Suffolk
- Shire county: Suffolk
- Region: East
- Country: England
- Sovereign state: United Kingdom
- Post town: STOWMARKET
- Postcode district: IP14
- Dialling code: 01449
- Police: Suffolk
- Fire: Suffolk
- Ambulance: East of England
- UK Parliament: Bury St Edmunds and Stowmarket

Bacton is a village and civil parish in Suffolk, England, about 8 kilometres (5.0 mi) north of Stowmarket. The village appeared as 'Bachetuna' in the Domesday Book and the area appears to have been settled at least since Roman times, with many interesting finds on the locally organised annual metal-detecting days.

At the centre of the village is the Twelfth Century church of St Mary the Virgin, featuring a medieval wall painting. Nearby is a doctors' surgery, a primary school Bacton Primary, and an under-fives preschool, but Bacton Middle School closed in 2015 as the local authority abandoned the three-tier education system and the site is now cleared and awaiting future redevelopment. In the original centre of the village is a small village green including a pond which until 2022 was fished for goldfish, roach, koi and mirror carp. At the start of that year the fish were removed and the pond was drained and restored, but due to the dry summer it did not refill until December and now awaits the recovery of the fish stocks. Housing in the village is a mixture of many well-preserved centuries-old listed buildings including the 18th century Grade II* listed Bacton Manor, alongside newer individual and estate-type properties with a large proportion of bungalows. During the last thirty years there was little new development other than occasional infill construction, but five large housing developments have now been approved and construction has begun on up to 350 new houses, nearly doubling the size of the village.

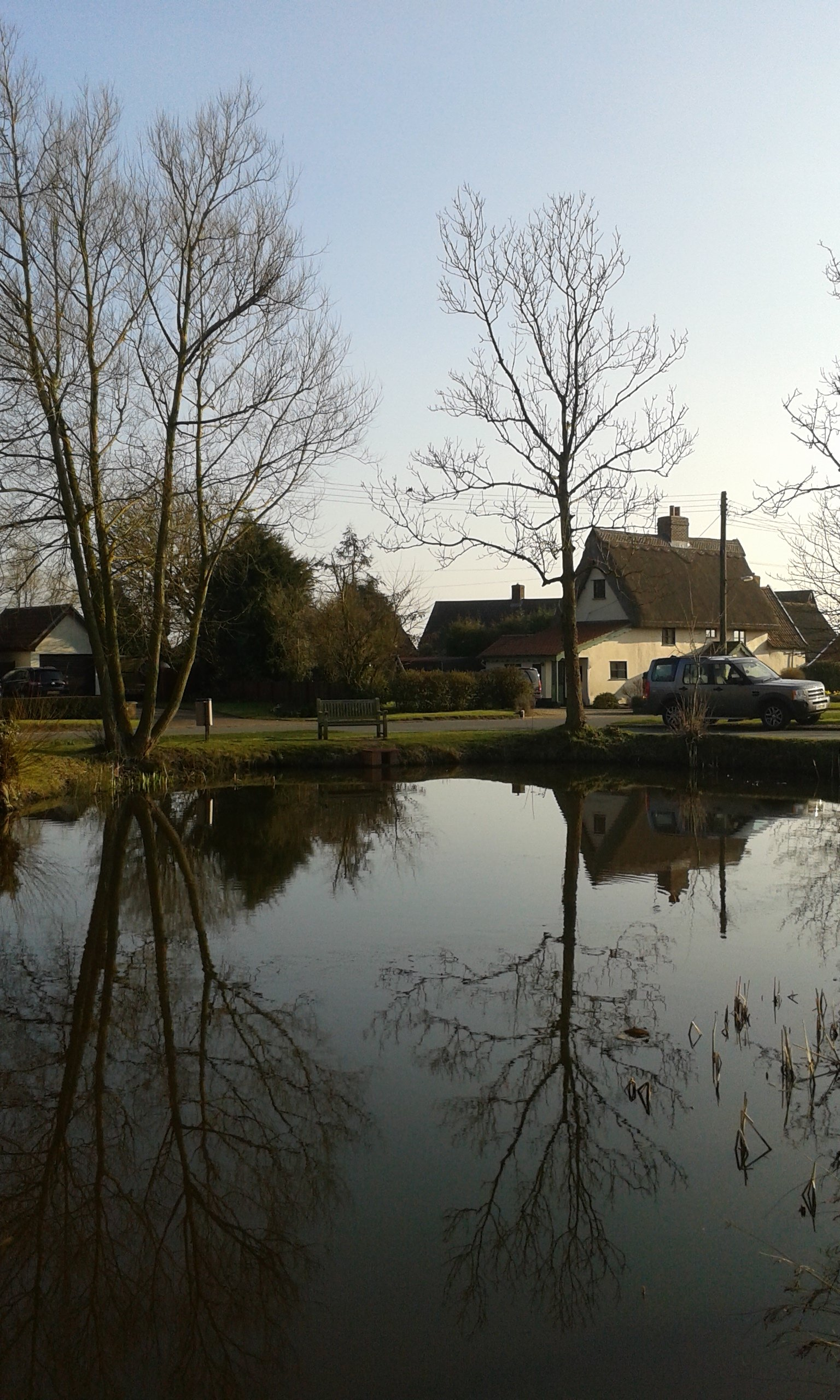
Bacton Village Pond, photographed in March 2015

Community facilities include a village hall with limited parking but a well-equipped kitchen, a bowls club playing in four local leagues, and Bacton United football club, with two adult sized floodlit pitches, a junior pitch and a clubhouse. The adult teams play in the Suffolk and Ipswich Football League while there are several junior teams of all age groups. The clubhouse is available for hire for social occasions, with a well-equipped bar. The church also has a community room for hire.

There are several community groups such as a branch of the Women's Institute, Guides, Brownies and Rainbows, a History Society, Gardening Club, Ladies' Circle and various other clubs and societies. The village Scout Association group closed some years ago due to lack of volunteers, but the Scout HQ building remains in occasional use. There is also a 16th-century thatched public house, the Bull at Bacton, with a restaurant area and regular live music.

The village has several shops and businesses including a Londis general store, post office, a petrol station, garage and car dealership. The Humber Doucy Brewing Company is also based in Bacton. Further along the B1113 and still in Bacton is Finbow's Yard, a small trading estate which is home to businesses including car sales, mobility shop, furniture store, white goods dealer and repairer, the Heart of Suffolk Distillery (home of Betty's Gin), hardware store and builders merchants, gift shop, coffee shop and a hairdressers. At the western end of the village is a business park with various units including one offering local pizza delivery and a 'Men's Shed' community workshop.

The Great Eastern Main Line railway between London and Norwich runs through the east end of the village, but Finningham railway station and its goods yard, which was situated in Bacton, was closed in the Beeching cuts of the 1960s and only the station building remains, now a private house. From the nearby town of Stowmarket, rail journeys to London take approximately 80 minutes, which has encouraged an influx of commuters. Bus services are limited, comprising once-a-week return shopping trips to two nearby towns.

The parish of Bacton includes the village itself, the adjoining hamlet of Earl's Green and the outlying settlements of Bacton Green, Canham's Green, Cow Green and Ford's Green. Cow Green, and Tailor's Green and Shop Green within Bacton village, are registered village greens under the care of the Parish Council.
