= Eye Priory =

Monastery in Suffolk, UK

- Interactive map of Eye Priory
- 52°19′22″N 1°09′22″E

Eye Priory was a Benedictine Priory dedicated to St Peter in the town of Eye in the English county of Suffolk. It was founded by Robert Malet c. 1080, and was originally an Alien Priory dependent on Bernay Abbey in Normandy. It became independent in 1385 by charter of Richard II when it could support only 3-4 monks. It was finally dissolved in 1537 as part of the Dissolution of the Monasteries, with the lands being given to Charles Brandon, 1st Duke of Suffolk.

Only the 15th/16th century 'gatehouse' now survives, in use as a barn. It is a Grade II listed building. During excavations, a 9th-century seal-die of Bishop Aethelwold (845-70) was found. Excavations in 1926 demonstrated that the church and claustral buildings were a replica of the mother-house. The church had an aisled nave with apsidal chancel and apsidal side chapels adjoining. The transepts also had apsidal chapels. The claustral buildings were arranged to the north, the cloister being 90 feet square. The site is scheduled as an ancient monument.
