= List of Anglo-Catholic churches in England =

This is a list of Anglo-Catholic churches in England.

== Province of Canterbury ==
Anglo-Catholic churches in the Province of Canterbury of the Church of England.

=== Diocese of Bath and Wells ===
Parish church	Location	Tradition	AEO	Refs
St Mary the Virgin's Church, Bathwick	Bathwick, Bath, Somerset	Modern Catholic	No (rescinded)	
St John the Baptist's Church, Bathwick	Bathwick, Bath, Somerset	Traditional Catholic	Yes (Bishop of Oswestry)	
Good Shepherd, Chard	Chard, Somerset	Traditional Catholic	Yes (Bishop of Oswestry)	
St John the Evangelist, Clevedon	Clevedon, Somerset	Traditional Catholic	Yes (Bishop of Oswestry)	
Holy Trinity, Taunton	Taunton, Somerset	Traditional Catholic	Yes (Bishop of Oswestry)	
All Saints' Church, Weston-super-Mare	Weston-super-Mare, Somerset	Traditional Catholic	Yes (Bishop of Oswestry)	

=== Diocese of Birmingham ===
Parish church	Location	Tradition	AEO	Refs
St Agatha's Church, Sparkbrook	Sparkbrook, Birmingham, West Midlands	Modern Catholic	Yes (Bishop of Oswestry)	
St Alban the Martyr, Birmingham	Birmingham, West Midlands	Traditional Anglo-Catholic	No (lapsed)	
St Alphege Church, Solihull	Solihull, West Midlands	Modern Catholic	No	
St John the Evangelist Church, Perry Barr	Perry Barr, West Midlands	Modern Catholic	No	
St Matthew's Church, Perry Beeches	Perry Beeches, West Midlands	Modern Catholic	No	
St Andrew's Church, Handsworth	Handsworth, West Midlands	Anglo-Catholic	No	
St Augustine's Church, Edgbaston	Edgbaston, Birmingham, West Midlands	Anglo-Catholic	No	
St Barnabas' Church, Balsall Heath	Handsworth, West Midlands	Traditional Catholic	Yes (Bishop of Oswestry)	
St Bartholomew's Church, Allen's Cross	Northfield, Birmingham, West Midlands	Modern Catholic	No	
St Mark's Church, Washwood Heath	Washwood Heath, Birmingham, West Midlands	Traditional Catholic	Yes (Bishop of Oswestry)	
St Mary's Church, Moseley	Moseley, Birmingham, West Midlands	Liberal Catholic	No	
St Michael's Church, Handsworth	Handsworth, West Midlands	Anglo-Catholic	No	
St Paul's Church, Balsall Heath	Balsall Heath, Birmingham, West Midlands	Liberal Catholic	No	
St Saviour's Church, Saltley	Saltley, Birmingham, West Midlands	Traditional Catholic	Yes (Bishop of Oswestry)	

=== Diocese of Bristol ===
Parish church	Location	Tradition	AEO	Refs
Church of All Saints, Clifton	Clifton, Bristol	Anglican Catholic	No (rescinded)	
St Andrew's Church, Chippenham	Chippenham, Wiltshire	Liberal Anglo-Catholic	No	
Cotham Parish Church	Cotham, Bristol	Liberal Catholic	No	
St Mark's Church, Swindon	Swindon, Wiltshire	Traditional Catholic	Yes (Bishop of Oswestry)	
St Paul's Church, Clifton, Bristol	Clifton, Bristol	Liberal Catholic	No	
Holy Nativity Church, Bristol	Knowle, Bristol	Anglican Catholic	Yes (Bishop of Oswestry)	
Holy Trinity Church, Horfield, Bristol	Horfield, Bristol	Inclusive Anglo-Catholic	No	

=== Diocese of Canterbury ===
Parish church	Location	Tradition	AEO	Refs
St Andrew's Church, Deal	Deal, Kent	Anglo-Catholic	Yes (Bishop of Richborough)	
St Michael and All Angels Church, Harbledown	Harbledown, Canterbury, Kent	Anglo-Catholic	Yes (Bishop of Richborough)	
St Michael and All Angels Church, Maidstone	Maidstone, Kent	Anglo-Catholic	Yes (Bishop of Richborough)	
St Mildred's Church, Canterbury	Canterbury, Kent	Modern Catholic	No	
St Peter's Church, Folkestone	Folkestone, Kent	Anglo-Catholic	Yes (Bishop of Richborough)	
St Peter & St Paul's Church, Borden	Borden, Sittingbourne, Kent	Modern Catholic	No	
Holy Trinity Church, Ramsgate	Ramsgate, Kent	Anglo-Catholic	Yes (Bishop of Richborough)	

=== Diocese of Chelmsford ===
Parish church	Location	Tradition	AEO	Refs
Ascension with All Saints, Chelmsford	Chelmsford, Essex	Modern Catholic	No	
St Clement's Church, Leigh-on-Sea	Leigh-on-Sea, Essex	Anglo-Catholic	No	
St Edmund's Church, Forest Gate	Forest Gate, London	Anglo-Catholic	No	
St James the Great, Colchester	Colchester, Essex	Traditional Catholic	Yes (Bishop of Richborough)	
St Peter and St Paul, Chingford	Chingford, London	Modern Catholic	No	
St Mary-at-Latton Church	Harlow, Essex	Liberal Catholic	No	
St. Luke's, Prittlewell				

=== Diocese of Chichester ===
Parish church	Location	Tradition	AEO	Refs
St Andrew's Church, Worthing	Worthing, West Sussex	Traditional Catholic	?	
Church of the Annunciation, Brighton	Brighton, East Sussex	Modern Catholic	No	
St Barnabas Church, Hove	Hove, East Sussex	Modern Catholic	Yes (Bishop of Chichester)	
St Bartholomew's Church, Brighton	Brighton, East Sussex	Traditional Catholic	?	
Christ Church, St Leonards-on-Sea	St Leonards-on-Sea, East Sussex	Traditional Anglo-Catholic	Yes (Bishop of Chichester)	
St Cosmas and St Damian Church, Keymer	Keymer, West Sussex	Liberal Catholic	No	
St James the Less Church, Lancing	Lancing, West Sussex	Traditional Catholic	?	
St John the Evangelist's Church, St Leonards-on-Sea	St Leonards-on-Sea, East Sussex	Open Catholic	No	
St Mark's Church, Hadlow Down	Hadlow Down, East Sussex	Modern Catholic	?	
St Mary's Church, Hampden Park, Eastbourne	Hampden Park, Eastbourne, East Sussex	Modern Catholic	No	
St Michael's Church, Brighton	Brighton, East Sussex	Modern Catholic	Yes (Bishop of Chichester)	
St Nicholas' Church, Brighton	Brighton, East Sussex	Modern Catholic	No	
St Nicolas Church, Pevensey	Pevensey, East Sussex	Traditional Anglo-Catholic	?	
St Paul's Church, Brighton	Brighton, East Sussex	Traditional Catholic	?	
St Peter's Church, West Blatchington	West Blatchington, Hove, East Sussex	Modern Catholic	?	
St Saviour's Church, Eastbourne	Eastbourne, East Sussex	Traditional Catholic	Yes (Bishop of Chichester)	
St Symphorian's Church, Durrington	Durrington, Worthing, West Sussex	Modern Catholic	?	
St Wilfrid's Church, Haywards Heath	Haywards Heath, West Sussex	Liberal Catholic	No	
St Michael and All Angels, Lancing	Lancing, West Sussex	Modern Catholic	?	

=== Diocese of Coventry ===
Parish church	Location	Tradition	AEO	Refs
St James, Ansty	Ansty, Coventry, Warwickshire	Modern Catholic	Yes (Bishop of Oswestry)	
St Oswald, Tile Hill	Tile Hill, Coventry, West Midlands	Modern Catholic	Yes (Bishop of Oswestry)	
St Mary Magdalen Church, Chapelfields	Chapelfields, Coventry, West Midlands	Liberal Catholic	No	
St Luke, Holbrooks	Holbrooks, Coventry, West Midlands	Modern Catholic	Yes (Bishop of Oswestry)	
St John the Baptist, Coventry	Coventry, West Midlands	Modern Catholic	Yes (Bishop of Oswestry)	
All Saints, Leamington Spa	Leamington Spa, Warwickshire	Modern Catholic	No	
St John the Baptist, Leamington Spa	Leamington Spa, Warwickshire	Modern Catholic	Yes (Bishop of Oswestry)	
St Mary and St John, Camp Hill	Camp Hill, Coventry, West Midlands	Modern Catholic	Yes (Bishop of Oswestry)	
St Mary's Abbey, Nuneaton	Nuneaton, West Midlands	Modern Catholic	Yes (Bishop of Oswestry)	
St Nicholas, Radford	Radford, Coventry, West Midlands	Modern Catholic	Yes (Bishop of Oswestry)	
St Andrew, Shilton	Shilton, Coventry, Warwickshire	Modern Catholic	Yes (Bishop of Oswestry)	

=== Diocese of Derby ===
Parish church	Location	Tradition	AEO	Refs
St Anne's Church, Derby	Derby, Derbyshire	Traditional Catholic	Yes (Bishop of Oswestry)	
St Luke's Church, Derby	Derby, Derbyshire	Traditional Catholic	Yes (Bishop of Oswestry)	
St Mark's Church, Derby	Chaddesden, Derby, Derbyshire	Modern Catholic	No	
St Werburgh's Church, Spondon	Spondon, Derby, Derbyshire	Inclusive Modern Catholic	No	
St Laurence's Church, Long Eaton	Long Eaton, Derbyshire	Traditional Catholic	Yes (Bishop of Oswestry)	

=== Diocese of Ely ===
Parish church	Location	Tradition	AEO	Refs
St Clement's Church, Cambridge	Cambridge, Cambridgeshire	Prayer Book Catholic	No (rescinded)	
Little St Mary's, Cambridge	Cambridge, Cambridgeshire	Anglo-Catholic	No	
St Peter-in-Ely	Ely, Cambridgeshire	Anglo-Catholic	No	
Parish Church of St Peter and St Paul, Wisbech	Wisbech, Cambridgeshire	Traditional Catholic	No	
Parish Church of St Edmunds, Downham Market	Downham Market, Norfolk	Traditional Anglo Catholic	Yes Bishop of Richborough	

=== Diocese of Exeter ===
All locations are in Devon.

Where AEO is provided, it is provided by the Bishop of Oswestry.

Parish church	Location	Tradition	AEO	Refs
Church of All Saints, Winkleigh	Winkleigh	Liberal Catholic	No	
St Martin's Church, Barton	Torquay	Modern Catholic	Yes	
St Michael and All Angels, Great Torrington	Great Torrington	Traditional Catholic	Yes	
St Michael and All Angels, Heavitree	Heavitree, Exeter	Modern Catholic	Yes	
St Lawrence, Heavitree	Heavitree, Exeter	Modern Catholic	Yes	
St Mary Steps, Exeter	Exeter	Traditional Catholic	Yes	
St Peter and St Mary Magdalene, Barnstaple	Barnstaple	Modern Catholic	Yes	
St Helen, Abbotsham	Abbotsham	Traditional Catholic	Yes	
St John's, Bovey Tracey	Bovey Tracey	Traditional Catholic	Yes	
St Luke, Milber	Newton Abbot	Modern Catholic	Yes	
St Gabriel, Peverell Park	Plymouth	Modern Catholic	Yes	
St John the Evangelist, Sutton-on-Plym	Plymouth	Modern Catholic	Yes	
St Simon the Apostle, Mount Gould	Plymouth	Modern Catholic	Yes	
St Mary the Virgin, Laira	Plymouth	Modern Catholic	Yes	
St Francis of Assisi, Honicknowle	Honicknowle, Plymouth	Modern Catholic	Yes	
St Chad, Whitleigh	Whitleigh, Plymouth	Modern Catholic	Yes	
St Aidan, Ernesettle	Ernesettle, Plymouth	Modern Catholic	Yes	
All Saints, Torre	Torquay	Modern Catholic	Yes	
All Saints, Babbacombe	Babbacombe, Torquay	Modern Catholic	Yes	
St Mary the Virgin, St Marychurch	St Marychurch, Torquay	Modern Catholic	Yes	
St Michael and All Angels Church, Mount Dinham, Exeter	Exeter	Anglo-Catholic	No	
St Peter and the Holy Apostles, Wyndham Square, Plymouth	Plymouth	Modern Catholic	Yes	

=== Diocese in Europe ===
Parish church	Location	Tradition	AEO	Refs
St. Boniface Church, Antwerp	Antwerp, Belgium	Traditional Catholic	Yes (Bishop of Richborough)	
St. George's Church, Paris	Paris, France	Modern Catholic	No	

=== Diocese of Gloucester ===
Parish church	Location	Tradition	AEO	Refs
All Saints' Church, Cheltenham	Cheltenham, Gloucestershire	Traditional Catholic	Yes (Bishop of Oswestry)	
St Philip and St James Church, Up Hatherley	Cheltenham, Gloucestershire	Traditional Catholic	Yes (Bishop of Oswestry)	

=== Diocese of Guildford ===
Parish church	Location	Tradition	AEO	Refs
St Mary's Church, Ewell	Ewell, Surrey	Catholic	No	

=== Diocese of Hereford ===
Parish church	Location	Tradition	AEO	Refs
St Laurence's Church, Ludlow	Ludlow, Shropshire	Modern Catholic	No	

=== Diocese of Leicester ===
Parish church	Location	Tradition	AEO	Refs
St Aidan's Church, St Oswald Road, New Parks, Leicester LE3 6RJ	Leicester, Leicestershire	Anglo-Catholic	Yes (Bishop of Richborough)	
St Andrew's Church, Leicester	Leicester, Leicestershire	Anglo-Catholic	No	
Church of St Mary de Castro, Leicester	Leicester, Leicestershire	Traditional Catholic	Yes (Bishop of Richborough)	
St Nicholas' Church, Leicester	Leicester, Leicestershire	Liberal	No	

=== Diocese of Lichfield ===
Parish church	Location	Tradition	AEO	Refs
All Saints with St Michael, Shrewsbury	Shrewsbury, Shropshire	Traditional Catholic	Yes (Bishop of Oswestry)	
Holy Trinity, Burslem	Burslem, Stoke-on-Trent	Traditional Catholic	Yes (Bishop of Oswestry)	
S. Saviour, Smallthorne	Smallthorne, Stoke-on-Trent	Traditional Catholic	Yes (Bishop of Oswestry)	
S. Werburgh, Burslem	Burslem, Stoke-on-Trent	Traditional Catholic	Yes (Bishop of Oswestry)	
Christ Church, Tunstall	Tunstall, Stoke-on-Trent	Modern Catholic	Yes (Bishop of Oswestry)	
St Andrew's Church, Birchills, Walsall	Birchills, Walsall, West Midlands	Modern Catholic	Yes (Bishop of Oswestry)	
St Chad's Church, Stafford	Stafford, Staffordshire	Traditional Catholic	No	
St Gabriel's Church, Walsall	Walsall, West Midlands	Modern Catholic	Yes (Bishop of Oswestry)	
Church of the Holy Angels, Hoar Cross	Hoar Cross, Staffordshire	Modern Catholic	Yes (Bishop of Oswestry)	
St Peter's Church, Edgmond	Edgmond, Shropshire	Modern Catholic	No	

=== Diocese of Lincoln ===
Parish church	Location	Tradition	AEO	Refs
All Saints' Church, Lincoln	Lincoln, Lincolnshire	Traditional Catholic	Yes (Bishop of Richborough)	
St Augustine of Hippo, Grimsby	Grimsby, Lincolnshire	Anglo-Catholic	Yes (Bishop of Richborough)	
St Mary's Church, Stamford	Stamford, Lincolnshire	Traditional Catholic	Yes (Bishop of Richborough)	

=== Diocese of London ===
All locations are in Greater London unless otherwise stated.

Where AEO is provided, it is provided by the Bishop of Fulham unless otherwise stated.

Parish church	Location	Tradition	AEO	Refs
St Alban's Church, Holborn	Holborn, Camden	Catholic	Yes	
All Hallows, Gospel Oak	Gospel Oak	Traditional Catholic	Yes	
All Hallows, Twickenham	Twickenham	Liberal Catholic	No	
All Hallows-by-the-Tower	City of London	Modern Catholic	No	
St Alphage, Burnt Oak	Burnt Oak	Traditional Catholic	Yes	
All Saints', East Finchley	East Finchley	Traditional Catholic	Yes	
All Saints, Margaret Street	Marylebone	Anglo-Catholic	Yes	
All Saints Notting Hill	Notting Hill, Kensington and Chelsea	Anglo-Catholic	Yes	
All Saints', Twickenham	Twickenham	Traditional Catholic	Yes	
St Andrew by the Wardrobe	City of London	Traditional Catholic	Yes	
St Andrew Holborn	Holborn, Camden	Modern Catholic	Yes	
St Andrew's, Kingsbury	Kingsbury	Traditional Catholic	Yes	
St Andrew, Stoke Newington	Stoke Newington, Hackney	Modern Catholic	No	
Church of the Annunciation, Marble Arch	Marble Arch	Inclusive Anglo-Catholic	No	
St Anne's Church, Brookfield	Dartmouth Park, Camden	Modern Anglo Catholic	No	
St Anselm's, Hatch End	Pinner	Tractarian	Yes	
St Anselm's, Hayes	Hayes, Hillingdon	Traditional Catholic	Yes	
St Augustine's, Grahame Park	Grahame Park	Traditional Catholic	Yes	
St Augustine's, Kilburn	Kilburn	Anglo-Catholic	Yes	
St Augustine's, Queen's Gate	Brompton, Kensington and Chelsea	Modern Catholic	No	
St Barnabas Bethnal Green	Bethnal Green / Bow, Tower Hamlets	Liberal Catholic	No	
Church of St Barnabas, Pimlico	Pimlico, City of Westminster	Anglo-Catholic	No	
St Bartholomew-the-Great	City of London	Anglo-Catholic	No	
St Bartholomew, Stamford Hill	Stamford Hill	Traditional Catholic	Yes	
St Benet's, Kentish Town	Kentish Town	Traditional Catholic	Yes	
St Benet Fink Church, Tottenham	Tottenham	Traditional Catholic	Yes	
St Botolph's Aldgate	Aldgate, City of London	Liberal Modern Catholic	No	
St Chad's, Haggerston	Haggerston, Hackney	Traditional Catholic	Yes	
Christ Church, Southgate	Southgate	Liberal Catholic	No	
St Clement's Church, Notting Dale	Notting Hill, Kensington and Chelsea	Inclusive Anglo-Catholic	No	
St Clement Danes	Strand, City of Westminster	Modern Catholic	No	
St Clement's, King Square	Finsbury, Islington	Anglo-Catholic	No	
St Cuthbert's, Earls Court	Earl's Court	Tractarian	Yes	
St Cyprian's, Clarence Gate	Marylebone	Traditional Anglo-Catholic	No	
St Dunstan, Cranford	Cranford	Traditional Catholic	Yes	
St Dunstan's, Stepney	Stepney, Tower Hamlets	Inclusive Catholic	No	
St Gabriel's, Warwick Square	Pimlico, City of Westminster	Traditional Catholic	Yes	
St Gabriel's, North Acton	North Acton, Ealing	Anglo-Catholic	No	
St George's, Bloomsbury	Bloomsbury, Camden	Modern Catholic	No	
St George's Church, Hanworth	Hanworth, Hounslow	Traditional Anglo-Catholic	Yes	
St George's, Headstone	Headstone	Prayer Book Catholic	Yes	
Grosvenor Chapel	City of Westminster	Liberal Catholic	No	
Holy Trinity, Hoxton	Hoxton	Traditional Catholic	Yes	
Holy Trinity, Kentish Town	Kentish Town	Traditional Catholic	Yes	
Holy Trinity Stroud Green	Granville Road, N4	Modern Catholic	Yes	
St James Garlickhythe	City of London	Prayer Book Catholic	Yes	
St James' Church, Norlands	Kensington and Chelsea	Liberal Catholic	No	
St James' Church, Islington	Islington	Modern Catholic	No	
St James's Church, Paddington	Paddington, City of Westminster	Traditional Catholic	Yes	
St John on Bethnal Green	Bethnal Green	Modern Catholic	No	
St John the Evangelist, Kensal Green	Kensal Green	Traditional Catholic	Yes	
St Luke's Church, Chelsea	Chelsea	Modern Catholic	No	
St Luke's, Shepherd's Bush	Shepherd's Bush	Traditional Catholic	Yes	
St Magnus-the-Martyr	City of London	Traditional Catholic	Yes	
St Mark's, Teddington	Teddington	Liberal Catholic	No	
St Mark the Evangelist, Noel Park	Noel Park	Traditional Catholic	Yes	
St Martin's Church, Ruislip	Ruislip, Hillingdon	Modern Catholic	No	
St Mary Abchurch	City of London	Traditional Catholic	No	
St Mary's, Harrow on the Hill	Harrow on the Hill, Harrow	Modern Catholic	No	
St Mary on Paddington Green Church	Maida Vale, City of Westminster	Anglo-Catholic	No	
St Mary's, Bourne Street	Belgravia	Anglo-Catholic	?	
St Mary's Church, Somers Town	Somers Town	Modern Catholic	?	
St Mary's, South Ruislip	South Ruislip	Traditional Catholic	Yes	
St Mary's, Tottenham	Tottenham	Traditional Catholic	Yes	
St Mary the Virgin, Hayes	Hayes, Hillingdon	Traditional Catholic	Yes	
St Mary the Virgin, Kenton	Kenton	Traditional Catholic	Yes	
St Mary the Virgin, Stanwell	Stanwell, Surrey	Traditional Catholic	Yes	
St Matthew's, Ashford	Ashford, Surrey	Traditional Catholic	Yes	
St Matthew's, Bethnal Green	Bethnal Green, Tower Hamlets	Modern Catholic	No	
St Matthew, Kensington Olympia	Kensington	Traditional Catholic	Yes	
St Matthew's Church, Westminster	City of Westminster	Modern Catholic	No	
St Matthew's Church, Willesden	Willesden, Brent	Traditional Catholic	Yes	
St Matthias, Stoke Newington	Stoke Newington	Traditional Catholic	Yes	
St Matthias the Apostle church, Colindale	Colindale, Barnet	Catholic	No	
St Michael's Church, Camden Town	Camden Town	Modern Anglo-Catholic	No	
St Michael, Cornhill	Cornhill	Prayer Book Catholic	Yes (Bishop of Maidstone)	
St Michael and All Angels, Ladbroke Grove	Ladbroke Grove	Traditional Catholic	Yes	
Our Most Holy Redeemer	Clerkenwell	Traditional Catholic	Yes	
St Pancras New Church	St Pancras	Liberal Catholic	No	
St Pancras Old Church	Somers Town	Traditional Catholic	Yes	
St Paul's Church, Harringay	Harringay	Modern Catholic	No	
St Paul's Church, Knightsbridge	Knightsbridge, City of Westminster	Anglo-Catholic	No	
St Paul's Church, New Southgate	New Southgate, Barnet	Modern Catholic	No	
St Paul's Church, Tottenham	Tottenham, Haringey	Traditional Catholic	No	
St Peter's Church, Eaton Square	Eaton Square, City of Westminster	Liberal Catholic	No	
St Peter and Paul, Enfield Lock	Enfield Lock	Traditional Catholic	Yes	
St Philip the Apostle, South Tottenham	South Tottenham	Traditional Catholic	Yes	
St Saviour's, Pimlico	Pimlico, City of Westminster	Catholic	No	
St Silas the Martyr, Kentish Town	Kentish Town	Traditional Catholic	Yes	
St Stephen's, Gloucester Road	South Kensington	Traditional Catholic	Yes	
St Thomas the Apostle, Hanwell	Hanwell, Ealing	Traditional Catholic	No	

=== Diocese of Norwich ===
Parish church	Location	Tradition	AEO	Refs
St Giles' Church, Norwich	Norwich, Norfolk	Modern Catholic	No	
St John the Baptist's Church, Timberhill, Norwich	Norwich, Norfolk	Traditional Catholic	Yes (Bishop of Richborough)	
St Mary and All Saints, Little Walsingham	Walsingham, Norfolk	Anglo-Catholic	Yes	
St Peters, Great Walsingham	Walsingham, Norfolk	Anglo-Catholic	Yes	
St Giles, Houghton St Giles	Houghton St Giles, Norfolk	Anglo-Catholic	Yes	
All Saints, North Barsham	North Barsham, Norfolk	Anglo-Catholic	Yes	
All Saints, East Barsham	East Barsham, Norfolk	Anglo-Catholic	Yes	
The Assumption, West Barsham	West Barsham, Norfolk	Anglo-Catholic	Yes	
Holy Trinity, Hempton	Hempton, Norfolk	Anglo-Catholic	Yes	
St Margaret of Antioch, Tatterford, Fakenham, Norfolk	Tatterford, Norfolk	Anglo-Catholic	No	
St Mary's, East Rudham, Norfolk	East Rudham, Norfolk	Anglo-Catholic	Yes	

=== Diocese of Oxford ===
Parish church	Location	Tradition	AEO	Refs
St John the Evangelist, New Hinksey, Oxford	Oxford, Oxfordshire	Traditional Catholic	Yes (Bishop of Oswestry)	
Church of All Saints, Cuddesdon	Cuddesdon, Oxfordshire	Liberal Catholic	No	
All Saints' Church, Maidenhead	Maidenhead, Berkshire	Traditional Catholic	No	
All Saints' Church, Reading	Reading, Berkshire	Anglo Catholic	No	
St Andrew's Church, Headington	Headington, Oxford, Berkshire	Modern Catholic	No	
St Barnabas Church, Oxford	Oxford, Oxfordshire	Traditional Catholic	No (rescinded)	
St Giles' Church, Reading	Reading, Berkshire	Traditional Catholic	Yes (Bishop of Oswestry)	
Holy Trinity Church, Reading	Reading, Berkshire	Anglo Catholic	Yes (Bishop of Oswestry)	
St Leonard's Church, Banbury	Banbury, Oxfordshire	Liberal Catholic	No	
St Margaret's Church, Oxford	Oxford, Oxfordshire	Modern Catholic	No	
Church of St Mark, Reading	Reading, Berkshire	Modern Catholic	No	
St Mary Magdalen's Church, Oxford	Oxford, Oxfordshire	Anglican Catholic	No	
Church of St Peter and St Paul, Wantage	Wantage, Oxfordshire	Catholic	No	
St Thomas the Martyr's Church, Oxford	Oxford, Oxfordshire	Prayer Book Catholic	No (rescinded)	
University Church of St Mary the Virgin	Oxford, Oxfordshire	Liberal Catholic	No	

=== Diocese of Peterborough ===
Parish church	Location	Tradition	AEO	Refs
All Saints' Church, Northampton	Northampton, Northamptonshire	Traditional Catholic	Yes (Bishop of Richborough)	
St Mary's Church, Higham Ferrers	Higham Ferrers, Northamptonshire	Catholic	No	
Church of St Mary the Virgin, Wellingborough	Wellingborough, Northamptonshire	Traditional Catholic	Yes (Bishop of Richborough)	
St Matthew's Church, Northampton	Northampton, Northamptonshire	Modern Catholic	No	

=== Diocese of Portsmouth ===
Parish church	Location	Tradition	AEO	Refs
All Saints' Church, Godshill	Godshill, Isle of Wight	Traditional Catholic	Yes (Bishop of Richborough)	
Holy Trinity Church, Gosport	Gosport, Hampshire	Anglo-Catholic	No	
St Mary's Church, Portsea	Portsea, Portsmouth, Hampshire	Anglo-Catholic	No	
St Saviour's Church, Portsea	Portsea, Portsmouth, Hampshire	Anglo-Catholic	Yes (Bishop of Richborough)	
Church of The Ascension, Portsea	Portsea, Portsmouth, Hampshire	Anglo-Catholic	Yes (Bishop of Richborough)	
Church of St Michael and All Angels, Swanmore, Ryde	Ryde, Isle of Wight	Modern Catholic	No	
Church of St Saviour-on-the-Cliff, Shanklin	Shanklin, Isle of Wight	Anglo-Catholic	Yes (Bishop of Richborough)	
Holy Spirit Church, Southsea	Southsea, Portsmouth, Hampshire	Anglo-Catholic	Yes (Bishop of Richborough)	

=== Diocese of Rochester ===
Parish church	Location	Tradition	AEO	Refs
St George's Church, Beckenham	Beckenham, Bromley, Greater London	Affirming Catholic	No	
St. Mary's Church, Hadlow	Hadlow, Kent	Anglican Liberal Catholic	No	
All Saints, Perry Street	Northfleet, Kent	Anglo-Catholic	Yes (Bishop of Richborough)	
St Barnabas' Church, Tunbridge Wells	Tunbridge Wells, Kent	Anglo-Catholic	Yes (Bishop of Richborough)	

=== Diocese of Salisbury ===
Parish church	Location	Tradition	AEO	Refs
Church of St Martin, Salisbury	Salisbury, Wiltshire	Traditional Anglo-Catholic	Yes (Bishop of Oswestry)	
St Peter's Church, Devizes	Devizes, Wiltshire	Modern Catholic	Yes (Bishop of Oswestry)	

=== Diocese of Southwark ===
All locations are in Greater London.

Where AEO is provided, it is provided by the Bishop of Fulham.

Parish church	Location	Tradition	AEO	Refs
St Agnes, Kennington Park	Kennington	Traditional Catholic	Yes	
The Ascension, Lavender Hill	Battersea	Traditional Catholic	Yes	
St Alban, South Norwood	South Norwood, Croydon	Anglo-Catholic	Yes	
All Saints Church, Benhilton	Benhilton, Sutton	Anglo-Catholic	Yes	
All Saints Church, East Sheen	Richmond upon Thames	Modern Catholic	No	
All Saints' Church, Putney Common	Putney Common	Liberal Catholic	No	
St Andrew's, Croydon	Croydon	Renewing Catholicism	No	
Croydon Minster	Croydon	Inclusive Liberal Catholic	No	
St Giles' Church, Camberwell	Camberwell, Southwark	Modern Catholic	No	
Holy Innocents Church, South Norwood	South Norwood, Croydon	Anglo-Catholic	No	
Church of the Holy Spirit, Clapham	Clapham	Modern Catholic	No	
Church of Holy Trinity, Eltham	Eltham, Greenwich	Inclusive Catholic	No	
St John the Divine, Kennington	Kennington	Catholic	No	
St John the Divine, Richmond	Richmond	Modern Catholic	No	
St John the Evangelist, Upper Norwood	Upper Norwood	Inclusive Catholic	No	
St John's Church, Waterloo	Waterloo	Modern Catholic	No	
St Luke's Church, Kingston upon Thames	Kingston upon Thames	Traditional Catholic	Yes	
St Mary's Church, Addington	Addington, Croydon	Modern Catholic	No	
St Mary's Church, Putney	Putney, Wandsworth	Liberal Catholic	No	
Church of St Mary the Virgin, Lewisham	Lewisham	Modern Catholic	No	
St Michael's, Croydon	South Norwood, Croydon	Traditional Catholic	Yes	
St Nicholas, Plumstead	Plumstead	Traditional Catholic	Yes	
St Olave's Church, Mitcham	Mitcham, Merton	Traditional Catholic	Yes	
St Paul's, Deptford	Deptford, Lewisham	Anglo-Catholic	No	
St Peter's, Clapham	Clapham	Traditional Catholic	No	
St Stephen, Lewisham	Lewisham	Anglo-Catholic	Yes	

=== Diocese of St Albans ===
Parish church	Location	Tradition	AEO	Refs
Church of All Saints, Leighton Buzzard	Leighton Buzzard, Bedfordshire	Liberal Catholic	No	
St Andrew and George's, Stevenage	Stevenage, Hertfordshire	Liberal Catholic	No	
St John's Church, Watford	Watford, Hertfordshire	Inclusive Anglo-Catholic	No	
St Mark's Church, Barnet Vale	Barnet Vale, Hertfordshire	Traditional Catholic	No	
St. Mary's Church, Potters Bar	Potters Bar, Hertfordshire	Modern Catholic	No (lapsed)	
St Paul's Church, Bedford	Bedford, Bedfordshire	Inclusive Anglo-Catholic	No	
St Saviour's Church, St Albans	St Albans, Hertfordshire	Inclusive Anglo-Catholic	No	

=== Diocese of St Edmundsbury and Ipswich ===
All locations are in Suffolk. AEO is provided by the Bishop of Richborough.

Parish church	Location	Tradition	AEO	Refs
St Bartholomew's Church, Ipswich	Ipswich	Anglo-Catholic	Yes	
St John the Evangelist Church, Bury St Edmunds	Bury St Edmunds	Liberal Catholic	No	
St Mary at the Elms Church, Ipswich	Ipswich	Traditional Catholic	Yes	
St Mary's Church, Mendlesham	Mendlesham	Traditional Anglo-Catholic	Yes	
Parish Church of Ss Peter & Paul, Eye, Suffolk	Eye, Suffolk	Traditional Anglo-Catholic	Yes	
St Mary's Church, Bedingfield	Bedingfield, Eye	Prayer Book Catholic	Yes	
St Michael and All Angels Church, Occold	Occold, Eye	Anglo-Catholic	Yes	

=== Diocese of Truro ===
All locations are in Cornwall.

Parish church	Location	Tradition	AEO	Refs
All Saints' Church, Falmouth	Falmouth	Traditional Catholic	No	
St George the Martyr's Church, Truro	Truro	Traditional Catholic	No	
St Ia's Church, St Ives	St Ives	Modern Catholic	No	
St John the Evangelist's Church, Truro	Truro	Modern Catholic	No	
St Michael and All Angels Church, Bude	Bude	Modern Catholic	No	

=== Diocese of Winchester ===
Parish church	Location	Tradition	AEO	Refs
St Peter's Church, Bournemouth	Bournemouth, Dorset	Liberal Catholic	No	
St Stephen's Church, Bournemouth	Bournemouth, Dorset	Liberal Catholic	No	
St Ambrose Church, Westbourne	Westbourne, Dorset	Anglo-Catholic	Yes	
Holy Trinity Church, Winchester	Winchester, Hampshire	Anglo-Catholic	Yes (Bishop of Richborough)	
St Barnabas Church, Hampshire	Southampton, Hampshire	Anglo-Catholic	Yes (Bishop of Richborough)	

=== Diocese of Worcester ===
Parish church	Location	Tradition	AEO	Refs
Church of St Edmund, Dudley	Dudley, West Midlands	Anglo-Catholic	No	
St John's Church, Kidderminster	Kidderminster, Worcestershire	Modern Catholic	No	
St Leonard's Chapel, Newland	Newland, Malvern, Worcestershire	Anglo-Catholic	No	
Church of St Matthias, Malvern Link	Malvern Link, Worcestershire	Liberal Modern Catholic	No	
St Thomas' Church, Stourbridge	Stourbridge, West Midlands	Liberal Catholic	No	

== Province of York ==
Anglo-Catholic churches in the Province of York of the Church of England.

=== Diocese of Blackburn ===
Parish church	Location	Tradition	AEO	Refs
St Barnabas' Church, Morecambe	Morecambe, Lancashire	Traditional Catholic	Yes (Bishop of Blackburn)	
St George's Church, Chorley	Chorley, Lancashire	Liberal Catholic	No	
Church of St George the Martyr, Preston	Preston, Lancashire	Traditional Catholic	Yes (Bishop of Blackburn)	
St James' Church, Briercliffe	Briercliffe, Lancashire	Inclusive Catholic	No	
St John's Minster, Preston	Preston, Lancashire	Modern Catholic	No	
St Matthew's Church, Burnley	Burnley, Lancashire	Liberal High Church	No	
St Peter's Church, Darwen	Darwen, Lancashire	Modern Catholic	No	
Church of St Stephen on-the-Cliffs, Blackpool	Blackpool, Lancashire	Traditional Catholic	Yes (Bishop of Blackburn)	

=== Diocese of Carlisle ===
Parish church	Location	Tradition	AEO	Refs
St Aidan's, Carlisle	Carlisle, Cumbria	Anglo-Catholic	Yes (Bishop of Beverley)	

=== Diocese of Chester ===
Parish church	Location	Tradition	AEO	Refs
St Andrew's Church, West Kirby	West Kirby, Wirral, Merseyside	Traditional Anglo-Catholic	Yes (Bishop of Beverley)	
St Bridget's Church, West Kirby	West Kirby, Wirral, Merseyside	Liberal Modern Catholic	No	
Church of St Martin, Marple	Marple, Stockport, Greater Manchester	Liberal Modern Catholic	No	
Holy Cross Church, Woodchurch	Birkenhead, Wirral, Merseyside	Modern Catholic	No	
Church of the Resurrection and All Saints, Caldy	West Kirby, Wirral, Merseyside	Liberal Modern Catholic	No	
St Thomas of Canterbury Church, Chester	Chester, Cheshire	Traditional Catholic	No	
St Peter's Church, Stockport	Stockport, Greater Manchester	Anglo-Catholic	Yes (Bishop of Beverley)	
Church of St Thomas the Apostle, Liscard	Liscard, Wallasey	Traditional Anglo-Catholic	Yes (Bishop of Beverley)	

=== Diocese of Durham ===
Parish church	Location	Tradition	AEO	Refs
Christ the King, Bowburn	Bowburn, County Durham	Traditional Catholic	Yes (Bishop of Beverley)	
St Helen's Church, Auckland	St Helen Auckland, County Durham	Traditional Catholic	Yes (Bishop of Beverley)	
St Hilda's Church, South Shields	South Shields, Tyne and Wear	Anglo-Catholic	No	
St James' Church, Coundon	Coundon, County Durham	Anglo-Catholic	Yes (Bishop of Beverley)	
St James the Great, Darlington	Darlington, County Durham	Traditional Catholic	Yes (Bishop of Beverley)	
St Luke's Church, Ushaw Moor	Ushaw Moor, County Durham	Traditional Catholic	Yes (Bishop of Beverley)	
St Margaret's Church, Durham	Durham, County Durham	Liberal Catholic	No	
St Peter's Church, Stockton-on-Tees	Stockton-on-Tees, County Durham	Liberal Catholic	No	
St Mary Magdalene, Sunderland	Sunderland, Tyne & Wear	Traditional Catholic	Yes (Bishop of Beverley)	
The Good Shepherd, Ford, Sunderland	Sunderland, Tyne & Wear	Traditional Catholic	Yes (Bishop of Beverley)	
St Mary, Horden	Horden, Co Durham	Traditional Catholic	Yes (Bishop of Beverley)	
St Mary, Seaham	Seaham, Co Durham	Prayer Book Catholic	Yes (Bishop of Beverley)	
St Aidan and St Columba Church	Oxford Road and Stockton Road, Hartlepool, Teesside	N/A	N/A	

=== Diocese of Leeds ===
Parish church	Location	Tradition	AEO	Refs
St Aidan's Church, Leeds	Leeds, West Yorkshire	Modern Catholic	No	
Church of All Saints, Elland	Elland, Calderdale, West Yorkshire	Modern Catholic	Yes (Bishop of Wakefield)	
All Souls' Church, Blackman Lane	Leeds, West Yorkshire	Liberal Anglo-Catholic	No	
St Bartholomew's Church, Armley	Armley, Leeds, West Yorkshire	Anglo-Catholic	No	
S. Chad, Toller Lane	Bradford, West Yorkshire	Traditional Catholic (English Missal)	Yes (Bishop of Wakefield)	
Church of St Mary, Elland	Elland, Calderdale, West Yorkshire	Modern Catholic	No	
St Michael and All Angels Church, Headingley	Headingley, Leeds, West Yorkshire	Liberal Catholic	No	
St Paul's Church, King Cross, Halifax	Halifax, Calderdale, West Yorkshire	Anglo-Catholic	Yes (Bishop of Wakefield)	
St Peter and St Leonard's Church, Horbury	Horbury, West Yorkshire	Anglo-Catholic	Yes (Bishop of Wakefield)	
St Saviour Church, Richmond Hill	Richmond Hill, Leeds, West Yorkshire	Anglo-Catholic	Yes (Bishop of Wakefield)	
St Thomas's Church, Huddersfield	Huddersfield, West Yorkshire	Modern Catholic	Yes (Bishop of Wakefield)	
St Wilfrid's Church, Harrogate	Harrogate, North Yorkshire	Traditional Catholic	Yes (Bishop of Wakefield)	
St Mary the Virgin, South Elmsall	South Elmsall, West Yorkshire	Liberal Anglo-Catholic	No	

=== Diocese of Liverpool ===
Parish church	Location	Tradition	AEO	Refs
Church of St Agnes and St Pancras, Toxteth Park	Toxteth, Liverpool, Merseyside	Anglo-Catholic	Yes (Bishop of Beverley)	
Church of St Dunstan, Liverpool	Edge Hill, Liverpool, Merseyside	Progressive Catholic	No	
Church of St James the Great, Haydock	Haydock, Merseyside	Traditional Catholic	Yes (Bishop of Beverley)	
Church of Saint John the Baptist, Liverpool	Tuebrook, Liverpool, Merseyside	Traditional Catholic	Yes (Bishop of Beverley)	
Church of St Margaret of Antioch, Liverpool	Toxteth, Liverpool, Merseyside	Liberal Catholic	No	
St Mary's Church, West Derby, Liverpool	West Derby, Liverpool, Merseyside	Liberal Traditional Catholic	No	
St Mary's Church, Walton-on-the-Hill	Walton, Liverpool, Merseyside	Modern Catholic	No	
Church of Our Lady and Saint Nicholas, Liverpool	Liverpool, Merseyside	Modern Catholic Anglican	No	
Church of St Thomas the Martyr, Upholland	Upholland, Lancashire	Liberal Catholic	No	

=== Diocese of Manchester ===
Parish church	Location	Tradition	AEO	Refs
Christ Church	Moss Side, Manchester	Anglo-Catholic	Yes (Bishop of Beverley)	
Holy Family	Failsworth, Manchester	Anglo-Catholic	Yes (Bishop of Beverley)	
Most Holy Trinity	Blackley, Manchester	Anglo-Catholic	Yes (Bishop of Beverley)	
St Augustine	Pendlebury, Manchester	Anglo-Catholic	Yes (Bishop of Beverley)	
St Chrysostom	Victoria Park, Manchester	Inclusive Anglo-Catholic	No	
St George	Stalybridge, Greater Manchester	Liberal Catholic	No	
St Luke	Oldham, Greater Manchester	Anglo-Catholic	Yes (Bishop of Beverley)	
St Luke	Lightbowne, Manchester	Anglo-Catholic	Yes (Bishop of Beverley)	
St Mary Magdalene	Monton, Manchester	Anglo-Catholic	Yes (Bishop of Beverley)	
St Matthew	Little Lever, Manchester	Anglo-Catholic	Yes (Bishop of Beverley)	
St Michael and All Angels	Peel Green, Manchester	Anglo-Catholic	Yes (Bishop of Beverley)	
St Paul	Royton, Manchester	Anglo-Catholic	Yes (Bishop of Beverley)	
St Peter	Swinton, Manchester	Anglo-Catholic	Yes (Bishop of Beverley)	
St Thomas	Pendleton, Salford, Greater Manchester	Modern Catholic	No	
Holy Innocents	Fallowfield, Manchester	Liberal Catholic	No	
The Ascension	Hulme, Manchester	Modern Catholic	No	

=== Diocese of Newcastle ===
Parish church	Location	Tradition	AEO	Refs
St John the Baptist Church, Newcastle upon Tyne	Newcastle upon Tyne, Tyne and Wear	Traditional Catholic	No	
St Luke's Church, Wallsend	Wallsend, Tyne and Wear	Anglo-Catholic	No	
St Matthew's Church, Newcastle upon Tyne	Newcastle upon Tyne, Tyne and Wear	Anglo-Catholic	No	
St Paul's Church, Whitley Bay	Whitley Bay, Tyne and Wear	Traditional Catholic	No	
St Peter's Church, Wallsend	Wallsend, Tyne and Wear	Anglo-Catholic	No	

=== Diocese of Sheffield ===
Parish church	Location	Tradition	AEO	Refs
St John and St Mary Magdalene Church, Goldthorpe	Goldthorpe, Barnsley, South Yorkshire	Traditional Catholic	Yes (Bishop of Beverley)	
St Matthew's Church, Sheffield	Sheffield, South Yorkshire	Anglo-Catholic	Yes (Bishop of Beverley)	
St Wilfrid's Church, Cantley	Cantley, Doncaster, South Yorkshire	Catholic	Yes (Bishop of Beverley)	
St Wilfrid's Church, Hickleton	Hickleton, Doncaster, South Yorkshire	Traditional Catholic	Yes (Bishop of Beverley)	

=== Diocese of Sodor and Man ===
Parish church	Location	Tradition	AEO	Refs
St Matthew the Apostle, Douglas	Douglas, Isle of Man	Anglo-Catholic	Yes (Bishop of Beverley)	

=== Diocese of Southwell and Nottingham ===
Parish church	Location	Tradition	AEO	Refs
St Cyprian's Church, Sneinton	Sneinton, Nottingham, Nottinghamshire	Traditional Catholic	Yes (Bishop of Beverley)	
Church of St John the Evangelist, Carrington	Carrington, Nottingham, Nottinghamshire	Inclusive Anglo-Catholic	No	
Church of St Mary Magdalene, Sutton-in-Ashfield	Sutton-in-Ashfield, Nottinghamshire	Liberal Catholic	No	
Church of St Mary the Virgin, Clumber Park	Clumber Park, Nottinghamshire	Anglo-Catholic	Yes (Bishop of Beverley)	
St Michael the Archangel's Church, Retford	Retford, Nottinghamshire	Modern Catholic	No	
Worksop Priory	Worksop, Nottinghamshire	Anglo-Catholic	Yes (Bishop of Beverley)	
St Mary Magdalene, Keyworth	Keyworth, Nottinghamshire	Anglo-Catholic	No	

=== Diocese of York ===
Parish church	Location	Tradition	AEO	Refs
All Saints' Church, North Street, York	York, Yorkshire	Traditional Catholic	Yes (Bishop of Beverley)	
St Lawrence's Church, York	York, Yorkshire	Traditional Catholic/Prayer Book Catholic	Yes (Bishop of Beverley)	
St Mary Bishophill Junior, York	York, Yorkshire	Anglo-Catholic	Yes (Bishop of Beverley)	
St Martin-on-the-Hill, Scarborough	Scarborough, North Yorkshire	Anglo-Catholic	No	
St Olave's Church, York	York, Yorkshire	Liberal Catholic	No	
St Saviour's Church, Scarborough	Scarborough, North Yorkshire	Anglo-Catholic	Yes (Bishop of Beverley)	

== See also ==
- Liberal Anglo-Catholicism
- Affirming Catholicism
- Category:Anglo-Catholic church buildings in England
