= Encounter Church =

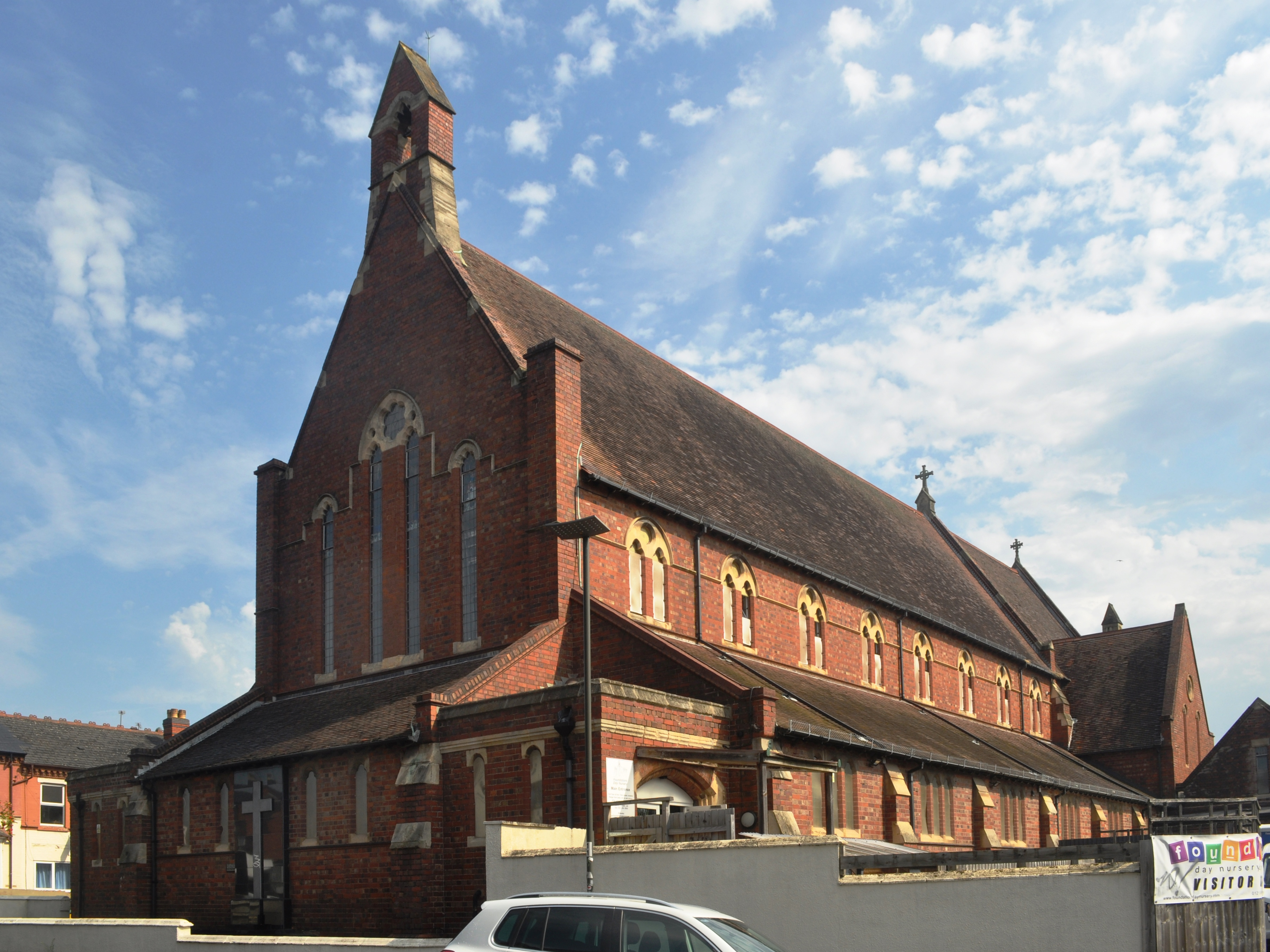
- The church in August 2024
- Encounter Church
- 52°26′30.47″N 1°55′53.04″W
- OS grid reference: SP 04662 82691
- Location: Bournbrook
- Country: England
- Denomination: Elim Pentecostal Church
- Previous denomination: Church of England
- Website: encounterchurch.uk

History
- Former name(s): St Wulstan’s Church, Bournbrook
- Consecrated: 1906

Architecture
- Architect(s): John Edward Knight Cutts and John Priston Cutts
- Completed: 1906
- Construction cost: £6,000

Specifications
- Capacity: 713 people

Encounter Church formerly known as Selly Oak Elim Church and formerly St Wulstan's is a parish church of the Church of England in the Bournbrook district of Birmingham, but which is now an Elim Pentecostal Church.

== History ==
St Wulstan's Church, Bournbrook, was established as a mission church to St Mary's Church, Selly Oak, in 1893. Countess Beauchamp laid a foundation stone for a new church building in Exeter Road on St Wulstan's Day, 19 January 1906, the inscription declaring that it was being built "To the Glory of God and for the benefit of the People of Bournbrook". The church was built of red and blue brick by the architects J. E. K. Cutts (1847-1938) and John Priston Cutts (1854-1935), was designed to accommodate 713 worshippers, cost approximately £5,600 (equivalent to £590,000 in 2025) to construct was consecrated by the Bishop of Birmingham on 6 October 1906.

In 1983 the parish of St Wulstan's, Bournbrook, merged with St Stephen's Church, Selly Park, and the Exeter Road building was swapped with Selly Oak Elim Church's building in Alton Road, Bournbrook. The local Elim congregation had been founded in 1936, and had initially met in people's homes before holding meetings at the Selly Oak Institute; hence why it is called the 'Selly Oak' Elim Church even though it is located in Bournbrook.

In 2018 Selly Oak Elim Church changed its name to Encounter Church.
