= St Luke's Church, Holbrooks =

- St Luke's Church, Holbrooks
- 52°26′35″N 1°30′39″W
- Location: Holbrooks, Coventry
- Country: Great Britain
- Denomination: Church of England
- Churchmanship: Traditional Catholic
- Website: www.stlukesholbrooks.co.uk

History
- Dedication: St Luke

Administration
- Province: Canterbury
- Diocese: Coventry
- Archdeaconry: Coventry
- Deanery: Coventry North
- Parish: Holbrooks

Clergy
- Bishop: Rt Revd Paul Thomas SSC (AEO)
- Vicar: Fr Simon Oakes SSC CMP

St Luke's Church is a parish church of the Church of England located in Holbrooks, Coventry, West Midlands, England.

== History ==
The earliest church of St Luke was constructed in 1916 of cinder blocks at the junction of Lythalls Lane and Holbrook Lane. It was started as a mission church from St Paul's, Foleshill, in which parish Holbrooks was originally situated. Next door a wooden hut served for many years as a venue for local community activities. With the opening of many more factories and works locally, the area soon expanded very quickly and plans were made for a purpose-built church.

The parish of Holbrooks was created in 1935 with Fr Charles Dodd as its first parish priest. From its beginnings, St Luke's has fostered a Catholic tradition and a regular round of sacramental worship was maintained.

The new church was built in Rotherham Road and completed in 1939 to the designs of Nugent Cachemaille-Day. The exterior was of red brick and notable features were an external altar and pulpit and concrete windows. Sadly, only a few months after its consecration, the church was rendered unusable by bombing in the 1940 Coventry Blitz. After several years the church was repaired and restored to its original appearance. A Parish Centre was added in the 1960s during the nearly 40-year incumbency of the much loved Fr Henry Hughes.

Alterations of the interior over the years have opened up the chancel, improved lines of sight and brought more light into the building. A major refurbishment in 2007 saw the installation of a new state-of-the-art heating system and new upholstered seating.

=== Present day ===
Today Saint Luke's remains as a sign of the Church's presence in Holbrooks and still offers its parishioners a place where they can meet with their fellow-worshippers, bring their deepest needs and concerns and also mark personal and family events, whether happy or sad. St Luke's stands in the traditionalist Catholic tradition of the Church of England and receives alternative episcopal oversight from the Bishop of Oswestry.
