= St Stephen's Church, Selly Park =

St Stephen’s Church, Selly Park
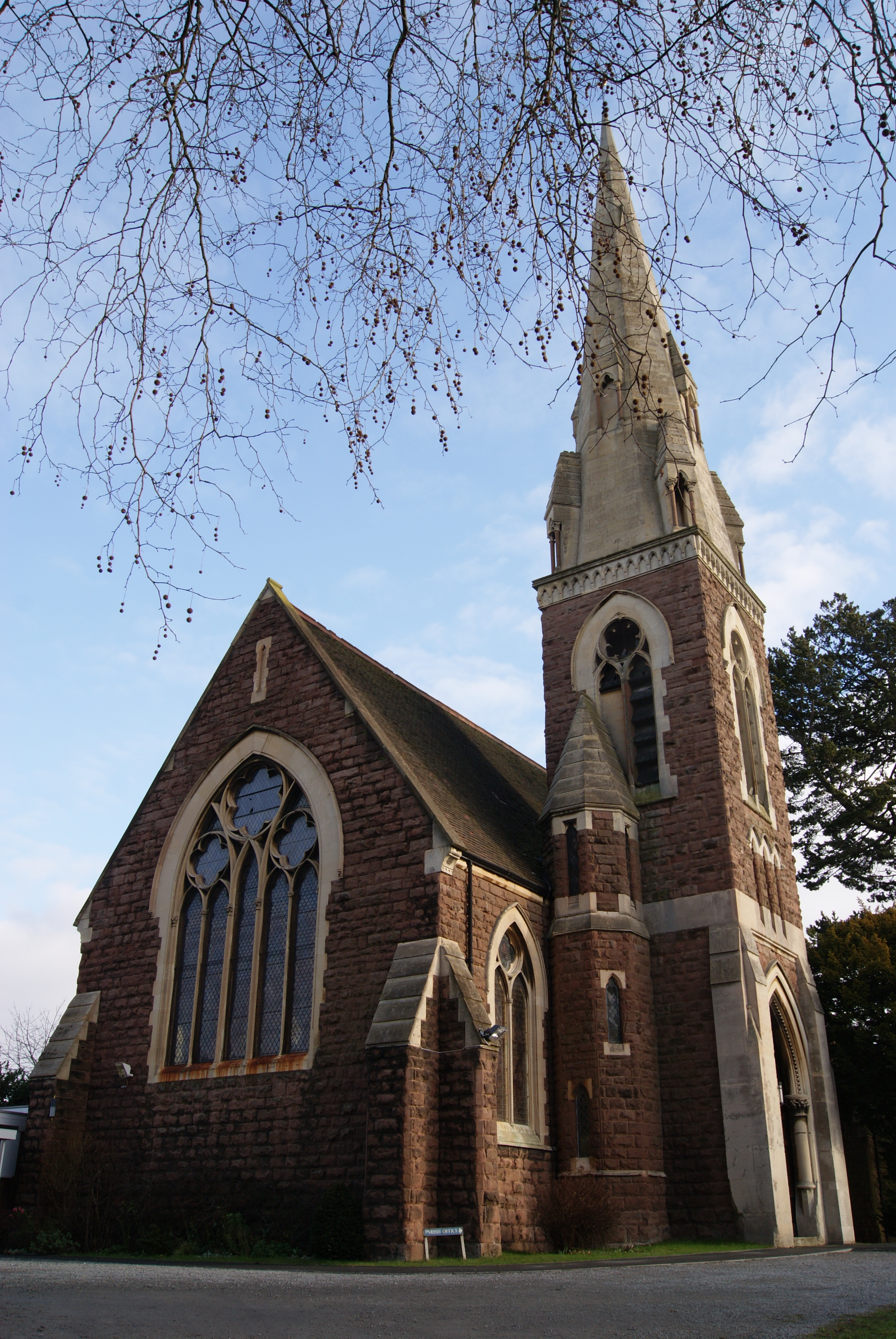
- St Stephen’s Church, Selly Park
- St Stephen’s Church, Selly Park
- 52.4435°N 1.9232°W
- OS grid reference: SP 05330 82834
- Location: Birmingham
- Country: England
- Denomination: Church of England
- Churchmanship: Conservative Evangelical
- Website: sssw.org.uk

Architecture
- Heritage designation: Grade II listed
- Architect: Martin & Chamberlain
- Groundbreaking: 1870
- Completed: 1871

Administration
- Diocese: Anglican Diocese of Birmingham
- Archdeaconry: Birmingham
- Deanery: Moseley
- Parish: St Stephen and St Wulstan, Selly Park

St Stephen's Church, Selly Park is a Grade II listed parish church in the Church of England in Birmingham.

== History ==
It was built between 1870 and 1871 by Martin & Chamberlain architects in the English Decorated Gothic style, as a daughter church of St Mary's Church, Selly Oak. It was consecrated on 18 August 1871.

A separate parish was assigned out of St Mary's Selly Oak in 1892.

St. Stephen's was combined with St Wulstan's Church, Bournbrook (now on Alton Road) to form a single parish. The Church Centre, formerly part of St. Stephen's, became a separate parish known as Christ Church, Selly Park, in 2004.

St Stephen's Church is within the Conservative Evangelical tradition of the Church of England, and it has passed resolutions to show that it rejects the ordination of women.

== Organ ==
The first organ in the church was built by Henry Jones and opened in 1875. A specification of the organ can be found on the National Pipe Organ Register.

== Bells ==
The church possesses a single 5cwt chiming bell cast by Barwell in 1870.
