= J. E. K. Cutts =

British architect (1847–1938)

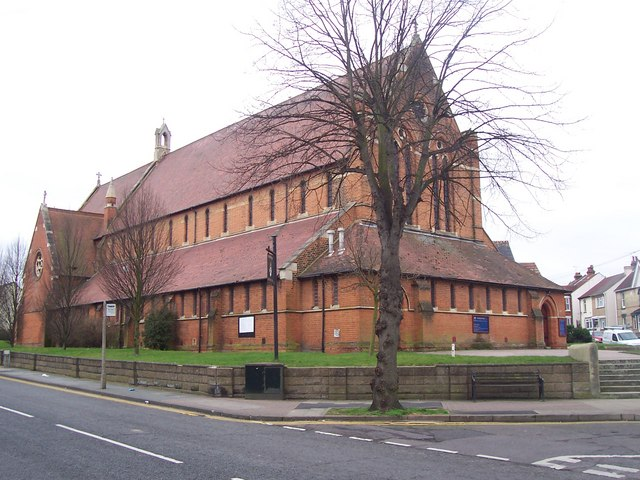
St Barnabas' Church, Gillingham. 1890

J E K Cutts May, 1909

John Edward Knight Cutts (1847–1938) FRIBA was a prolific church architect in England.

== Background ==
Cutts was born on 20 March 1847 in Lenton, Nottingham, the son of Edward Lewes Cutts and Mary Ann Elizabeth Knight. Cutts attended the Felsted School, Felsted, 1862 – 1865. He was elected a Fellow of the Royal Institute of British Architects in 1891. With his brother, John Priston Cutts, he designed and supervised the construction of 46 churches in England between 1873 and 1912.

He married Emma Peacock on 29 August 1882 in St Mary's Church, Islington. They had 7 children – the first two died as children and were buried in England. Five survived and all lived in Canada.

He retired to Canada in 1912. He died on 20 August 1938, near Acton, Ontario, Canada.

== Works ==
- Christ Church, North Kensington, London
- Herne Hill Mission Competition, London
- Wooden reredos, St Matthew's Church, Oxhey Village, Watford, Hertfordshire
- St Bartholomew's Church, Notgrove, Gloucestershire 1872–73 restoration
- St Luke's Church, Diamond Street, Camberwell, Southwark, London 1876-77 (destroyed by bombing in the London Blitz)
- St Peter's Church, Upper Slaughter, Gloucestershire 1877 restoration
- St Peter's Church, Prescott Place, Clapham Manor Street, Lambeth, London 1878
- Wyck Rissington Church, Gloucestershire 1878–79 restoration
- St Matthew's Church, Sydenham, London 1879–80
- Cottage Hospital, Bourton on the Water, Gloucestershire 1878–79
- St Leonard's Church, Bledington, Gloucestershire 1878–79 restoration
- St Edward's Church, Evenlode, Gloucestershire 1878-79 restoration
- St Thomas a Becket Church, Todenham, Gloucestershire 1879 restoration
- South Farnborough Church 1880–81 restoration
- St Mary's Church, Billericay 1881 repairs
- St Mary the Virgin's Church, Baldock, Hertfordshire 1881–82 restoration
- St Augustine's Church, Dovercourt 1883–84
- St Michael and All Angels Church, Stoke Newington, London
- All Saints' Church, Upper Holloway, London 1884–85
- St Andrew's Church, Birchills, Walsall 1884–87
- St Mary's Church, Lansdowne Road, Haringey, London 1886–87
- St Andrew's Church, Longton, Lancashire 1887
- St Saviour's Church, Hanley Road, Upper Holloway 1887–88
- All Saints’ Church, Tufnell Park, London 1887–88
- St Barnabas' Church, Nelson Road, Gillingham Kent 1890
- Holy Trinity Church, Rickmansworth Road, Northwood, Hillingdon 1894–95 addition of North aisle
- Oxhey Chapel, Watford, Hertfordshire 1897 Addition of vestries
- Marlborough College Mission Buildings 1899–1900
- St Martin's Church, Kensal Rise, 1899
- St George's Church, Freezywater, Enfield, Middlesex 1900–1906
- St Wulstan's Church, Bournbrook, 1906
- St Silas' Church, Nunhead, 1903 (declared redundant and demolished in 2001)
- St Philip the Apostle, Tottenham 1906
- Christ Church and St John, Manchester Road, Isle of Dogs 1906–07 vestry enlarged
- St Luke the Evangelist's Church, New Brompton, Gillingham, Kent 1908
- St Paul's Church, St Albans 1909
- St Mark's Church, Bush Hill Park, Enfield, Middlesex 1893–1915
- St Matthew's Church, Ponders End, Enfield, Middlesex. Addition of chancel 1900-01
