= St Matthew's Church, Newcastle upon Tyne =

St Matthew's Newcastle
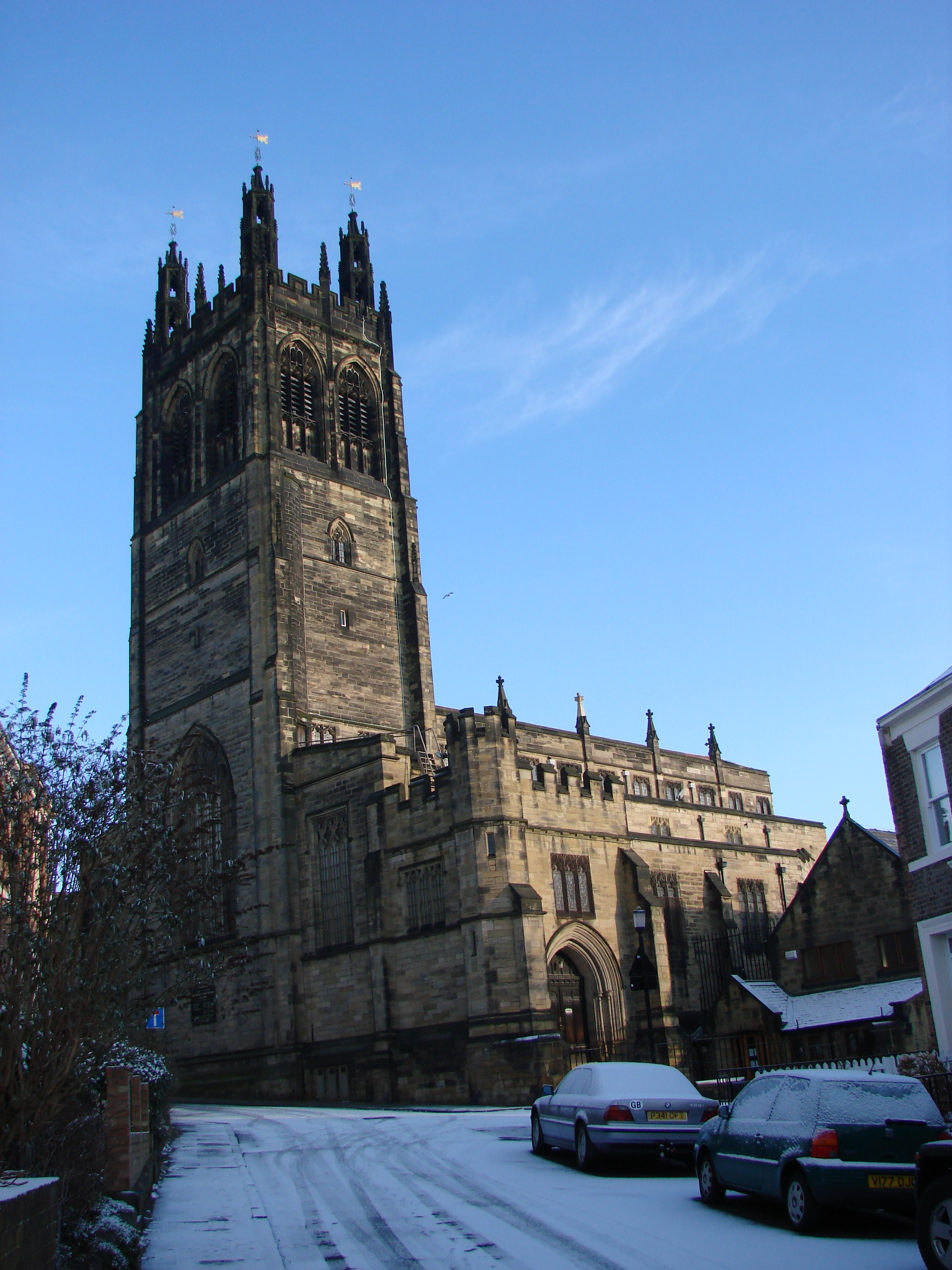
- St Matthew's Newcastle
- 54.9713°N 1.6292°W
- Location: Big Lamp, Summerhill Street, Newcastle upon Tyne
- Country: England
- Denomination: Church of England
- Churchmanship: Anglo-Catholic / High Church
- Website: matthewhighelswick.com

History
- Status: Active
- Founded: 1869
- Dedication: Saint Matthew
- Dedicated: 1870
- Consecrated: 1880

Architecture
- Functional status: Parish church
- Architect: R. J. Johnson (1832 - 1892)

Administration
- Province: Province of York
- Diocese: Diocese of Newcastle
- Archdeaconry: Archdeaconry of Northumberland
- Deanery: Newcastle West Deanery
- Parish: Newcastle: St Matthew and St Mary

Clergy
- Priest: Fr Richard Deadman

The Church of Saint Matthew is a Church of England Grade II* listed parish church located in the High Elswick area of Newcastle upon Tyne, within the Georgian suburb of Summerhill

== History ==
Saint Matthew's was formed out of Saint John's parish in November, 1869, and the Parish is the home of four former parishes - Saint Philip (Elswick), Saint Augustine (Brighton Grove), Saint Matthew (Big Lamp), and Saint Mary the Virgin (Rye Hill).

== Tradition ==
Saint Matthew's was founded after the foundations of the Catholic Revival had been set; with its first Vicar, Father Robert Daunt, being described by the time of his death as "a decided High Churchman, [who] had held strong views on the question of the independence of the Church in spiritual matters.". As such, the church has, from its founding, followed the Anglo-Catholic High Church tradition — a rarity within the diocese.
