= St Barnabas' Church, Morecambe =

Coordinates: 54.0646°N 2.8781°W

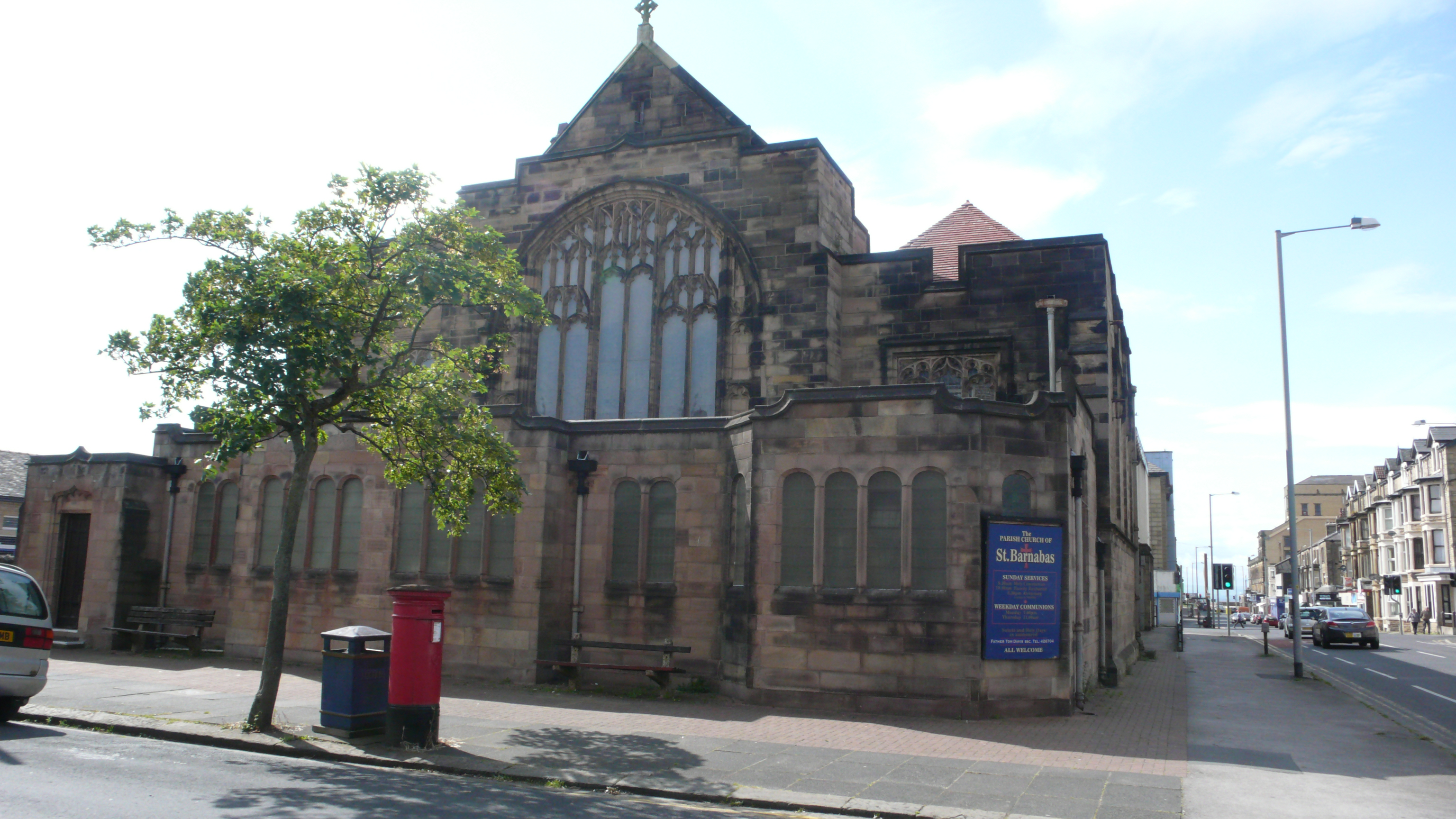

- Location in Morecambe
- OS grid reference: SD 42626 63539
- Location: Regent Road, Morecambe, Lancashire
- Country: England
- Denomination: Anglican
- Churchmanship: Anglican Catholic
- Website: https://stbmorecambe.org/

History
- Status: Parish church
- Dedication: Saint Barnabas

Architecture
- Functional status: Active
- Architect: Austin and Paley
- Architectural type: Church
- Style: Gothic Revival
- Groundbreaking: 1898
- Completed: 1900

Specifications
- Materials: Stone

Administration
- Province: York
- Diocese: Blackburn
- Archdeaconry: Lancaster
- Deanery: Lancaster and Morecambe
- Parish: St Barnabas, Morecambe

Clergy
- Bishop: The Rt Revd Philip North (AEO)
- Priest: Fr Michael Childs

St Barnabas' Church is in Regent Road, Morecambe, Lancashire, England. It is an active Anglican parish church in the deanery of Lancaster and Morecambe, the archdeaconry of Lancaster, and the diocese of Blackburn.

== History ==
The church was partially built between 1898 and 1900 to a design by the Lancaster architects Austin and Paley. At this time the chancel, five bays of the nave, and the north aisle were constructed at a cost of £4,214 (equivalent to £450,000 in 2025). In 1904 a font was installed, and in 1913 the south aisle and an organ chamber were added. A parish hall was built across the west end in 1961.

=== Present day ===
The worship at St Barnabas is in the catholic tradition of the Church of England. The parish priest is Fr Michael Childs, who was instituted and inducted as Vicar of the parish in September 2018.

== Architecture ==
St Barnabas' Church is designed in "free Perpendicular" style, and is described as being "low and solid". It has aisles that run through to the east end. Inside, the nave has three-bay arcades carried on alternating round and octagonal piers. Between the nave and the chancel is a low wall that incorporates the pulpit. The stained glass dates between the 1970s and 1989, other than glass from the late 19th century that was re-set in 1989. The three manual organ was made by Wadsworth and Brother.

== See also ==
- List of ecclesiastical works by Austin and Paley (1895–1914)
