= St Andrew's Church, Birchills, Walsall =

Coordinates: 52°35′18″N 1°59′41″W

St Andrew's Church, Walsall
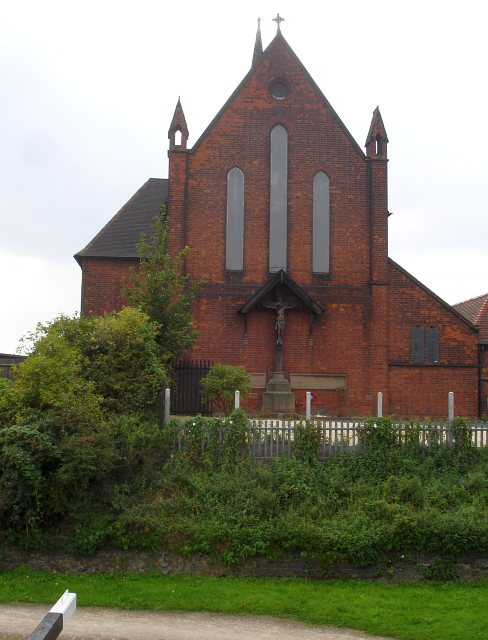
- St Andrew's Church, Birchills, Walsall
- St Andrew's Church, Walsall
- Country: United Kingdom
- Denomination: Church of England
- Churchmanship: Traditional Catholic
- Website: www.achurchnearyou.com/walsall-st-andrew-the-birchills/

History
- Dedication: St Andrew

Architecture
- Architect: J. E. K. Cutts

Administration
- Province: Canterbury
- Diocese: Lichfield
- Archdeaconry: Walsall
- Deanery: Walsall
- Parish: St. Andrew Walsall

St Andrew's Church is a Church of England parish church in Walsall, West Midlands. The parish includes the residential Birchills area of Walsall, and Reedswood Park.

== History ==
The church was built between 1884 and 1887, and consists of a chancel, a nave, aisles, an organ chamber, and a turret. The parish was constituted in 1889 and the living was made a vicarage with a gross value of £200.

St Andrew's stands in the Modern Catholic tradition of the Church of England. As it rejects the ordination of women, the parish receives alternative episcopal oversight from the Bishop of Ebbsfleet (currently Jonathan Goodall).
