= St Philip the Apostle, Tottenham =

St Philip's Church, Tottenham
- Parish Church of St Philip the Apostle
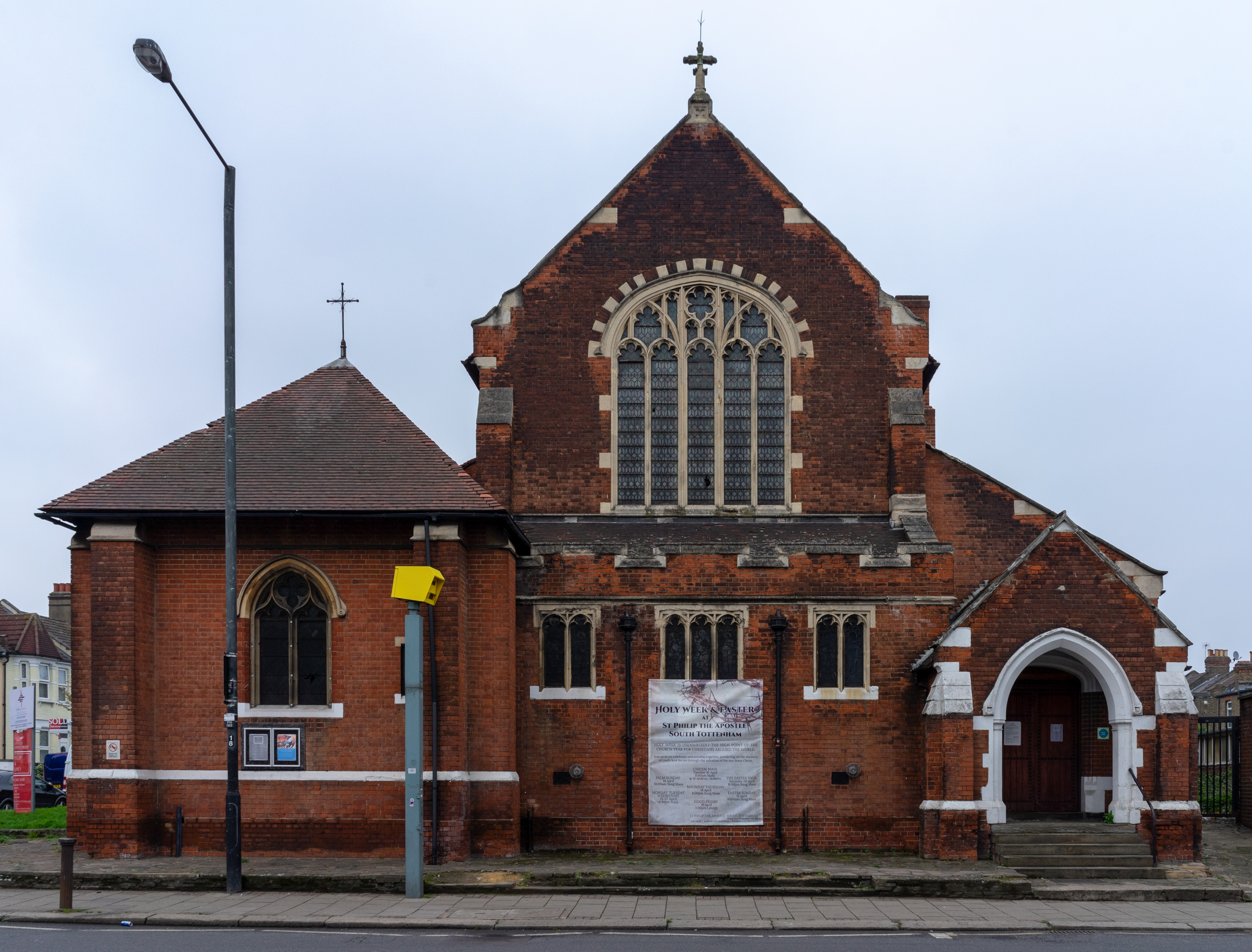
- St Philip's Church, Tottenham
- 51.58875°N 0.08332°W
- Location: Philip Lane, Tottenham, London N15 4HJ
- Country: England
- Denomination: Church of England
- Churchmanship: Traditional Anglo-Catholic
- Website: www.spst.org.uk

History
- Founded: 1906

Architecture
- Architect: J. E. K. Cutts

Administration
- Province: Canterbury
- Diocese: London
- Archdeaconry: Hampstead
- Deanery: Haringey
- Parish: St. Philip, Tottenham

St Philip the Apostle Church is a Church of England parish church in Tottenham, London, and part of the Diocese of London.

In 1899 the London Diocesan Home Mission established a district which was served by an iron church in Philip Lane. A permanent church, dedicated to St Philip the Apostle, was founded in 1906 on the east corner of Clonmell Road and Philip Lane. A consolidated chapelry, from the parishes of Holy Trinity and Christ Church, was formed in 1907, and the Bishop of London became patron of the living. The new church, of red brick with stone dressings, was designed by J. P. Cutts in the Perpendicular style; it was not orientated and consisted of an aisled nave, a chancel, which was finished in 1911, and a south-east chapel, and seated 800. There were plans for a north-west tower, of which only the first stage was completed. The organ came from St. Philip, Clerkenwell. (fn. 154) A yellow-brick church hall was built to the west, near Spur Road.
