= All Saints' Church, East Finchley =

Church in East Finchley, London, England

Coordinates: 51.5918°N 0.1597°W

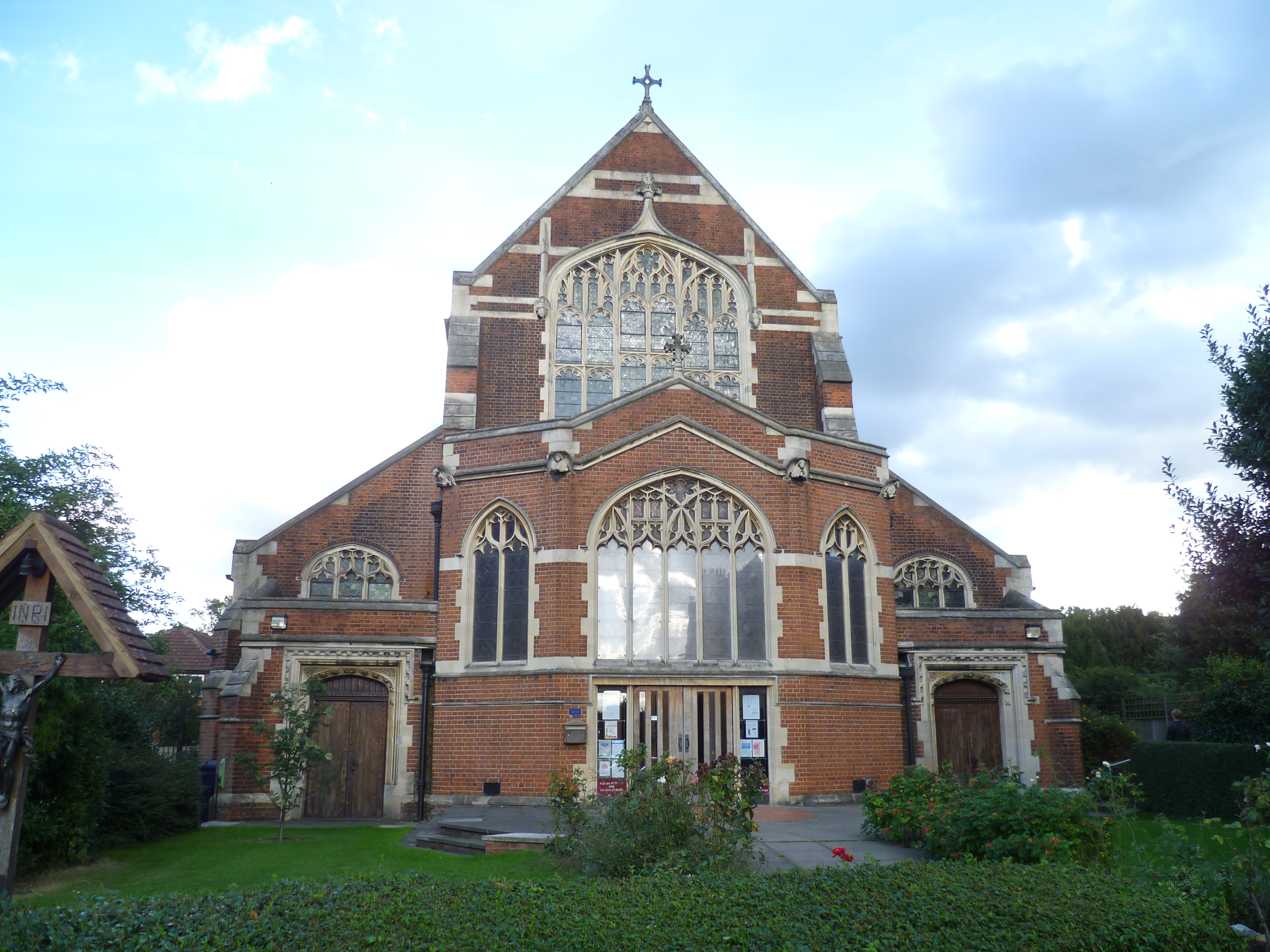
All Saints' Church

All Saints' Church is a Church of England church in Durham Road, East Finchley, London. It is a grade II listed building with Historic England.
