= St Mary's Church, Tottenham =

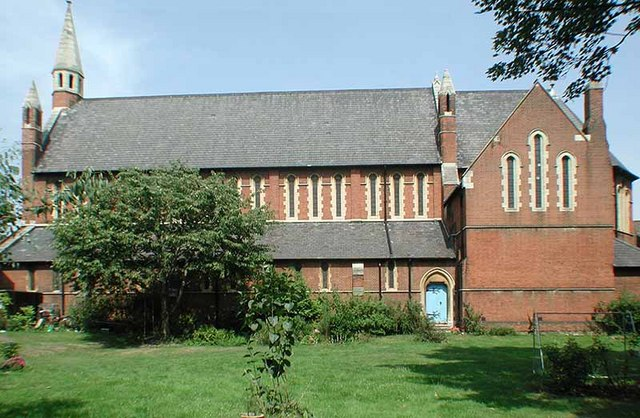
- St Mary's Church, Tottenham
- 51°35′54.479″N 0°3′59.771″W
- Country: England
- Denomination: Church of England
- Tradition: Traditional Catholic

Administration
- Province: Canterbury
- Diocese: London
- Archdeaconry: Hampstead
- Deanery: Haringey

Clergy
- Vicar: The Reverend Lee Clark
- Priest(s): The Reverend Andrew Bailey (Associate Vicar)

St Mary's Church is a Church of England parish church on the south side of Lansdowne Road in Tottenham in north London.

It began in 1881 as a mission from Marlborough College and was initially housed in the board school at Coleraine Park (now Coleraine Park Primary School). Three years later it became a mission district, with the college contributing more than a third of the cost of the site for a permanent church. In 1887 it was consecrated, and the following year it turned into a consolidated chapelry, formed from All Hallows, Holy Trinity and St Paul. The red brick permanent church was designed by J. E. K. Cutts.

The organ was built by William Hill & Sons in 1889, when the firm was managed by Thomas Hill, son of the founder. The same builder was employed to make some alterations to the instrument three years later. Lack of maintenance in the 20th century led to the organ falling out of use, but in 2009–10 it was removed from the church for restoration, including a Barker lever mechanism.

== List of vicars ==
- 1884–1908 – E. F. Noel Smith
- 1908–1940 – Arthur Anderson
- 1940–1945 – J. G. Jeffreys
- 1946–1951 – W. Howes Morris
- 1951–1953 – Interregnum
- 1953–1985 – David Evans
- 1985–1994 – Christopher Tuckwell
- 1994–2011 – Luke Miller
- 2011–2023 – Simon Morris
- 2024 – L. R. Clark
