= St Matthias the Apostle church, Colindale =

Coordinates: 51.5863°N 0.2453°W

St. Matthias the Apostle, Colindale
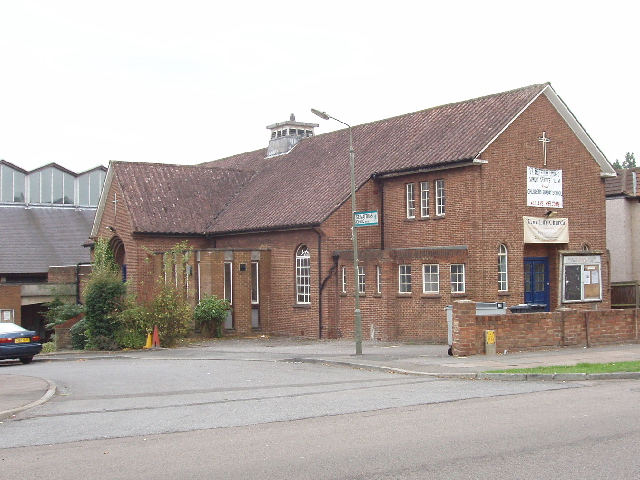
- St. Matthias Church, Colindale
- St. Matthias the Apostle, Colindale
- Denomination: Church of England
- Churchmanship: Anglo-Catholic

History
- Dedication: St. Matthias

Administration
- Diocese: London
- Archdeaconry: Hampstead
- Deanery: West Barnet
- Parish: Colindale

Clergy
- Priest: Fr Matthew Duckett

St Matthias the Apostle Church is an Anglican church in the parish of Colindale, London, England.
