= St Anne's Church, Derby =

St Anne’s Church, Derby
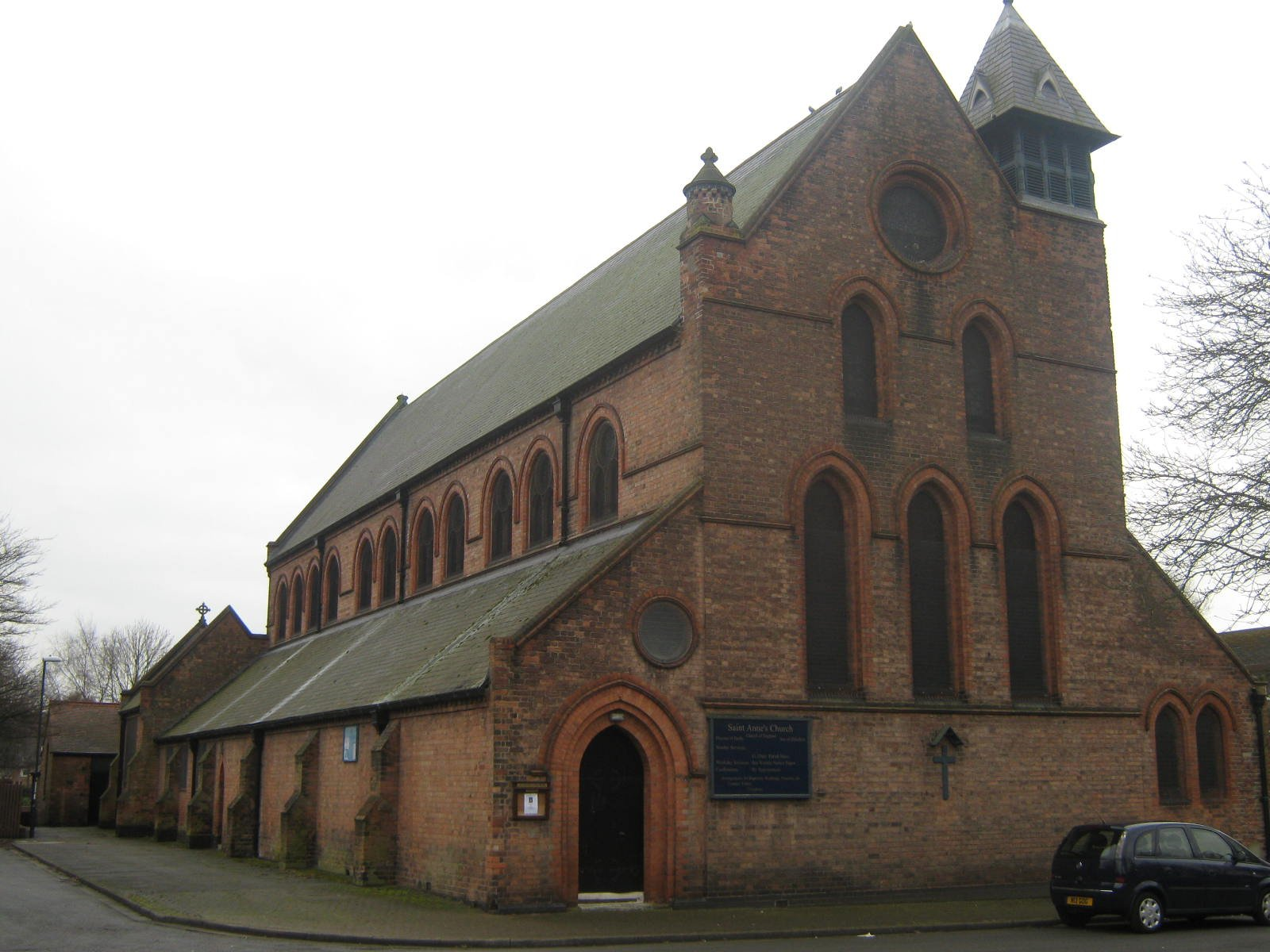
- St Anne’s Church, Derby
- St Anne’s Church, Derby
- 52°55′41″N 1°29′25.7″W
- Location: Derby
- Country: England
- Denomination: Church of England
- Churchmanship: Anglo-Catholic

History
- Dedication: St Anne

Architecture
- Heritage designation: Grade II* listed
- Designated: 3 July 1998
- Architect: F.W. Hunt
- Style: Gothic Revival
- Groundbreaking: 1871
- Completed: 1872

Specifications
- Length: 95 feet (29 m)
- Width: 26 feet (7.9 m)
- Height: 50 feet (15 m)

Administration
- Diocese: Diocese of Derby
- Archdeaconry: Derby
- Deanery: Derby North
- Parish: St Anne, Derby

Clergy
- Bishop: Rt Revd Paul Thomas SSC (AEO)
- Priest: Fr Giles Orton

St Anne's Church, Derby is a Grade II* listed Church of England parish church in Derby.

== History ==
The foundation stone was laid on 24 October 1871 and the church was consecrated on 26 July 1872 by the Bishop of Lichfield. It was 95 ft long, 26 feet wide and 50 ft to the apex of the roof. It was built of Spondon best red brick, with stonework only for the pillars of the arcades and tracery of the clerestory windows. The architect was F.W. Hunt of London and the contractor was Robert Bridgart of Derby. Mears and Stainbank of London provided a bell weighing nearly 6 cwt.

After Father Michael Brinkworth retired in 2006 the church was unable to find a replacement priest and the church closed in 2013. It reopened after just over one year after the PCC were able to find volunteer clergy to perform services every two weeks.

The parish stands in the Anglo-Catholic tradition of the Church of England. As it rejects the ordination of women, the parish receives alternative episcopal oversight from the Bishop of Oswestry (currently Paul Thomas). The Church also receives the patronage of The Society.

== Parish Status ==
The current priest is Fr Giles Orton assisted by Father Bob Boyle and Fr Michael Brinkworth

== Organ ==
When the church was consecrated, they borrowed a second hand instrument on hire from Mrs Smith of Park Field until funds could be raised for a permanent organ. The organ was installed by Brindley & Foster and opened on Ascension Day, 30 May 1878 at a cost of £370 (equivalent to £38,078 in 2025). A specification of the organ can be found on the National Pipe Organ Register. It is no longer present in the church.

=== Organists ===
- J.E. Burgess ca. 1883
- Arthur Timms 1899 - 1930
- Frank Bint 1930 - ????
- Raymond Oxley approx. 1970 - 2008
- Andrew Storer 2008 -
- Tom Corfield 2021 -
