= Holbrooks =

Area of Coventry, England

Coordinates: 52.443°N 1.509°W

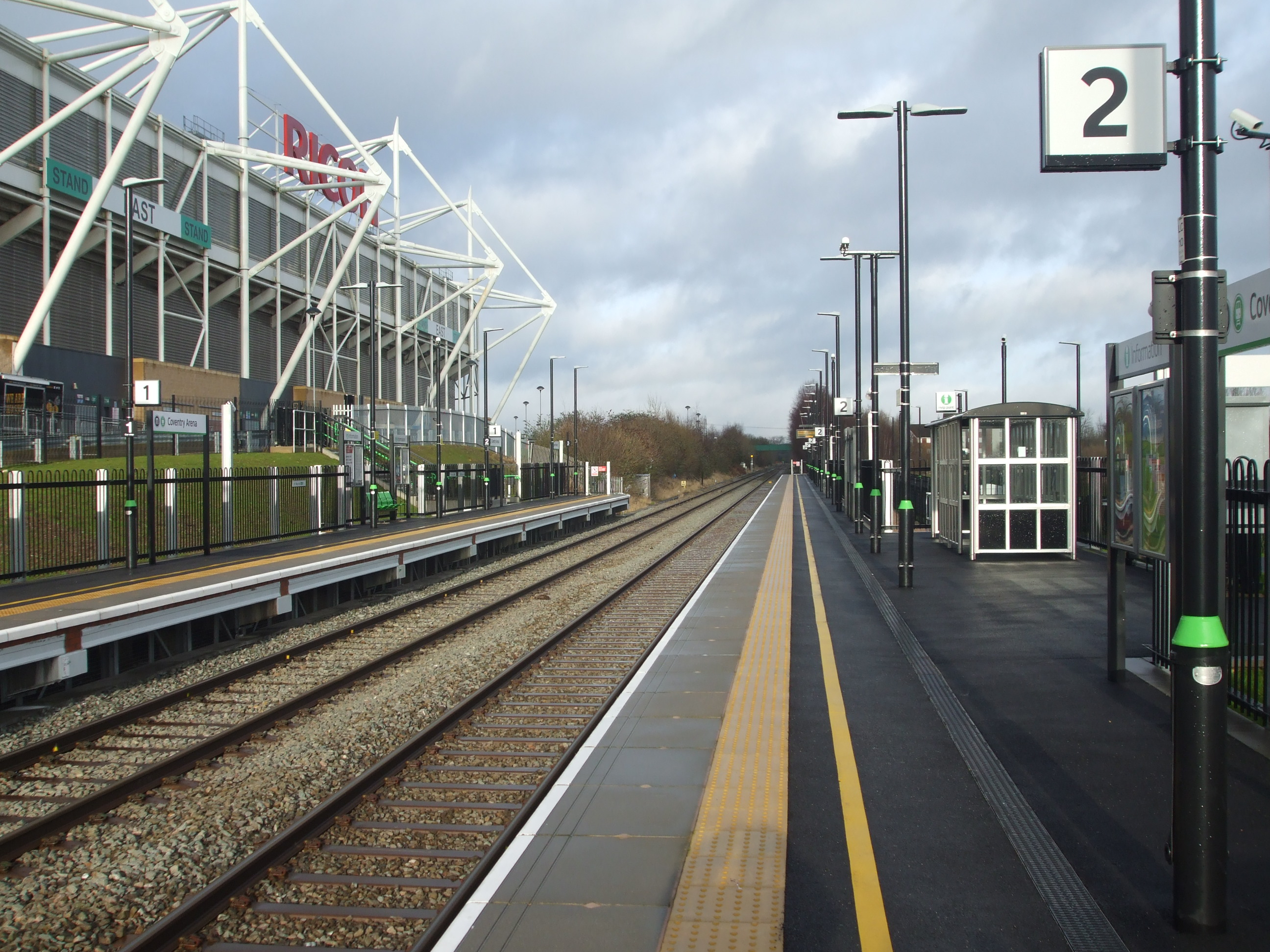
Coventry Arena Rail Station.

Holbrooks is a residential area of Coventry, West Midlands, England.

Most of the length of the four brooks which pass through the area are covered or culverted, one culvert is adjacent to the recently built housing on Watery Lane. Another brook passes through and under the grounds of Parkgate School. The brooks then head off towards the river Sherbourne and the Sowe.

Holbooks is situated some 3 mi (5 km) north-west to the city centre and was largely developed for private and council housing during the 1950s and to replace the many homes destroyed by air raids during the Second World War.

== History ==
The 'Stadium' housing estate at the rear of Lythalls Lane is so called because the housing was built on the site of a former dog racing stadium. In 1928 the Stadium speedway track opened. The track was closed in 1936 and the following year a greyhound track opened on the site This remained in use until 1964 when it was replaced by the housing.

Children in Holbrooks now have fewer places to play as various pockets of land, once open spaces between development, are being swallowed up to in-fill, although Holbrooks Park, on Holbrook Lane, remains the area's largest open space.

== Coventry Building Society Arena ==
Holbrooks is close to the Coventry Building Society Arena (formally the Ricoh Arena), (which was designed to have limited parking to promote bus travel and walking) a parking permit scheme is in place. The stadium, and the adjacent Arena Park Shopping Centre are served by Coventry Arena railway station, opened in 2016. The Arena is currently home to Coventry City FC . It has hosted other sporting events including preliminary round football during the London 2012 Olympics (during which it was renamed the City of Coventry Stadium), and several music concerts. Notable acts who have played here include Bon Jovi 2008, Take That June 2009, and reformed Coventry bands The Specials and also The Enemy. Manchester band Oasis played the Ricoh during July 2009 and American act Pink, artist Alecia Moore played during 2010. The venue also includes a casino and large exhibition and conference centre.

== Housing ==
Another notable social housing estate in Holbrooks is the area of Everdon Road. Built after the Second World War, and accessed from either Beake Avenue or Holbrook Lane, this is a more spacious well-designed housing estate with mostly three- and four-bedroom houses with large rooms and tall roofs. Also several one-bedroom bungalows with the same tall roof design. Due to the spacious layout of the estate, more bungalows were recently built as 'infill' and in the future more development is likely.

There are a number of four storey residential flats on Everdon Road too, some have open views across parkland. The shape of the Everdon estate forms a complete loop and includes a small row of shops with flats above. Everdon is regularly used by learner drivers to practice, due to there being many corners, curves and reversing opportunity, plus the road is quiet during the school day. Most houses face onto grassed areas, and the estate is bordered by the large Holbrook Park which is maintained by Coventry City Council.

== Today ==
Today Holbrooks has a diverse and large cultural mix which includes a large number of Polish people. There are two Polish food stores along Holbrook Lane, and several other food outlets and ethnic restaurants. The Arena Park Shopping Centre, on the Foleshill-Holbrooks border, features several national chain stores along with one of the largest Tesco stores in the country. A Morrisons store on Parkgate Road offers an alternative supermarket choice. The area's single surviving post office is located on Holbrook Lane.

Holbooks Primary School is in the adjacent suburb of Foleshill. Schools for primary age (4–11) children in Holbrooks include Parkgate (one of the largest primary schools in Coventry), John Shelton Primary School, and Holy Family RC Primary School. Secondary education is provided at President Kennedy School in Rookery Lane.

Holbrooks is also a short distance from the former British Coal Keresley Colliery site which is now a large industrial estate of warehousing called Prologis Park. The large wheel from the winding tower was cut into two, and placed on Prologis Park as a monument to the site's former activity.

Current and former occupiers of ProLogis Park include GEFCO and Terex Benford, Tesco (warehousing), Co-op, Exel Bridgestone, Mastercare, DHL Exel Supply Chain, Richard Austin Alloys, Inkfish and Domestic & General. Prologis park covers some 300 acres (1.2 km^{2}) of land and includes a 'nature park' and arboreal area with two man-made lakes and some additional marshland where wildlife monitoring takes place. No fishing is allowed, and many species of bird use the habitat.

Under the terrain of Holbrooks (and surrounding areas) are several mined coal seams at a depth ranging of 600–1,500 metres, these coal seams are known as the Warwickshire Thick, locally extracted to the pit head at Keresley from 1917 and until its eventual closure in 1991. The site was then used as a homefire plant until its complete closure in the year 2000. In 1939, at its peak, a million tons of coal was being extracted per year.

Keresley coal was distributed via the railway line which still runs through Holbrooks and crosses Wheelwright Lane, the line was completed in 1919. Today, the line carries freight from Prologis Park, along the same route the coal had taken, crossing Wheelright Lane then running parallel with Winding House Lane, leaving Holbrooks over a cast iron bridge situated at Hen Lane, onwards toward Foleshill and towards Coventry.

The coal mining and town gas industry was a major source of employment for Holbrooks and Binley areas of Coventry. Mining in the Midlands was undertaken on a neighbouring coal seam, extracted from Daw Mill. The mine was Britain's biggest coal producer. It closed in 2013 following a major fire. It was the last remaining colliery in the West Midlands. Today, Daw Mill along with the pit head at Keresley is just a memory.
