= Bedingfield, Suffolk =

Village in Suffolk, England

Coordinates: 52°16′25″N 1°11′40″E

Bedingfield
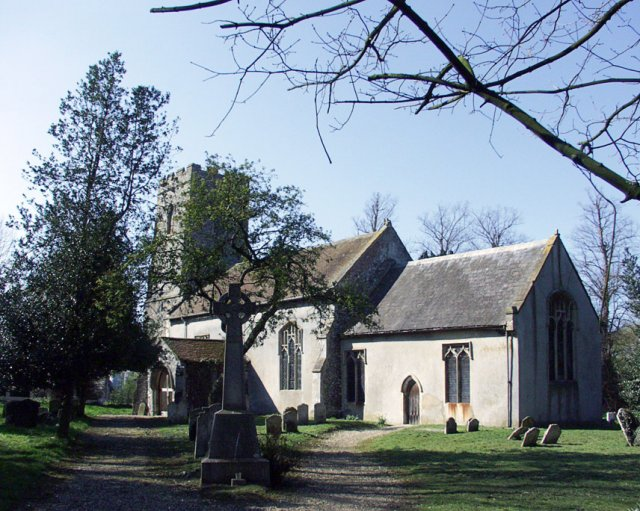
- St Mary's Church, Bedingfield

- Location within Suffolk
- Population: 236 (2021 census)
- District: Mid Suffolk
- Shire county: Suffolk
- Region: East
- Country: England
- Sovereign state: United Kingdom
- Post town: Eye
- Postcode district: IP23

Bedingfield is a village and civil parish in the Mid Suffolk district of Suffolk, England. In 2021 the parish had a population of 236.

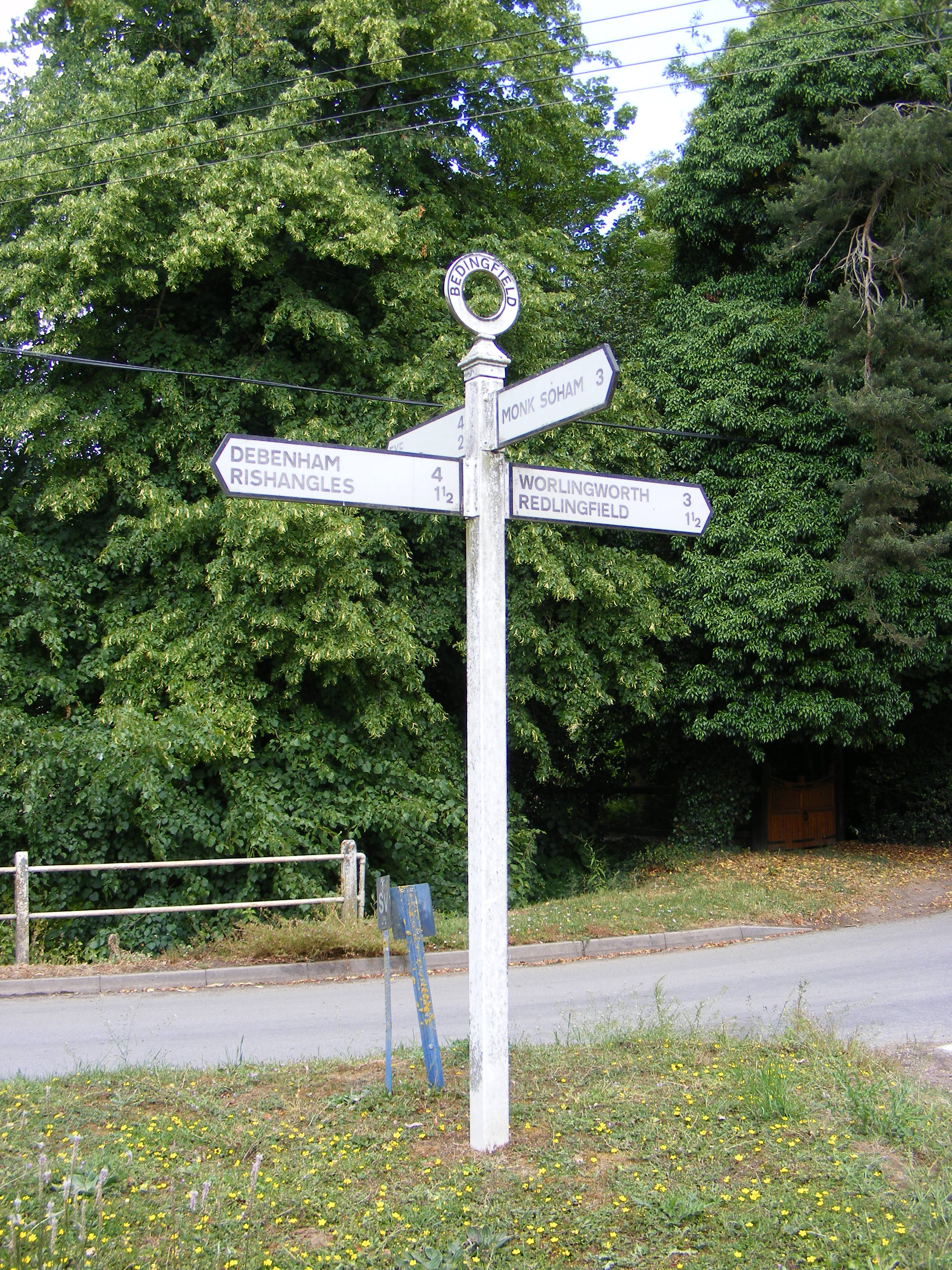
Bedingfield Roadsign

== Notable residents ==
- Thomas Bedingfield (c.1554–1635/36), lawyer and politician who was J.P. for Suffolk from 1584 and the Member of Parliament for Eye in 1586.
- Angus McBean (1904–1990), Welsh photographer, set designer and cult figure associated with surrealism.
- Jasper Conran (1959– ), fashion designer.

All three have lived at Flemings Hall in the parish.

== Bedingfield Church ==
St Mary's Church, Bedingfield - a Grade I Listed Building
