= St Mary's Church, Bedingfield =

Church history and architecture

Coordinates: 52°16′27″N 1°11′38″E

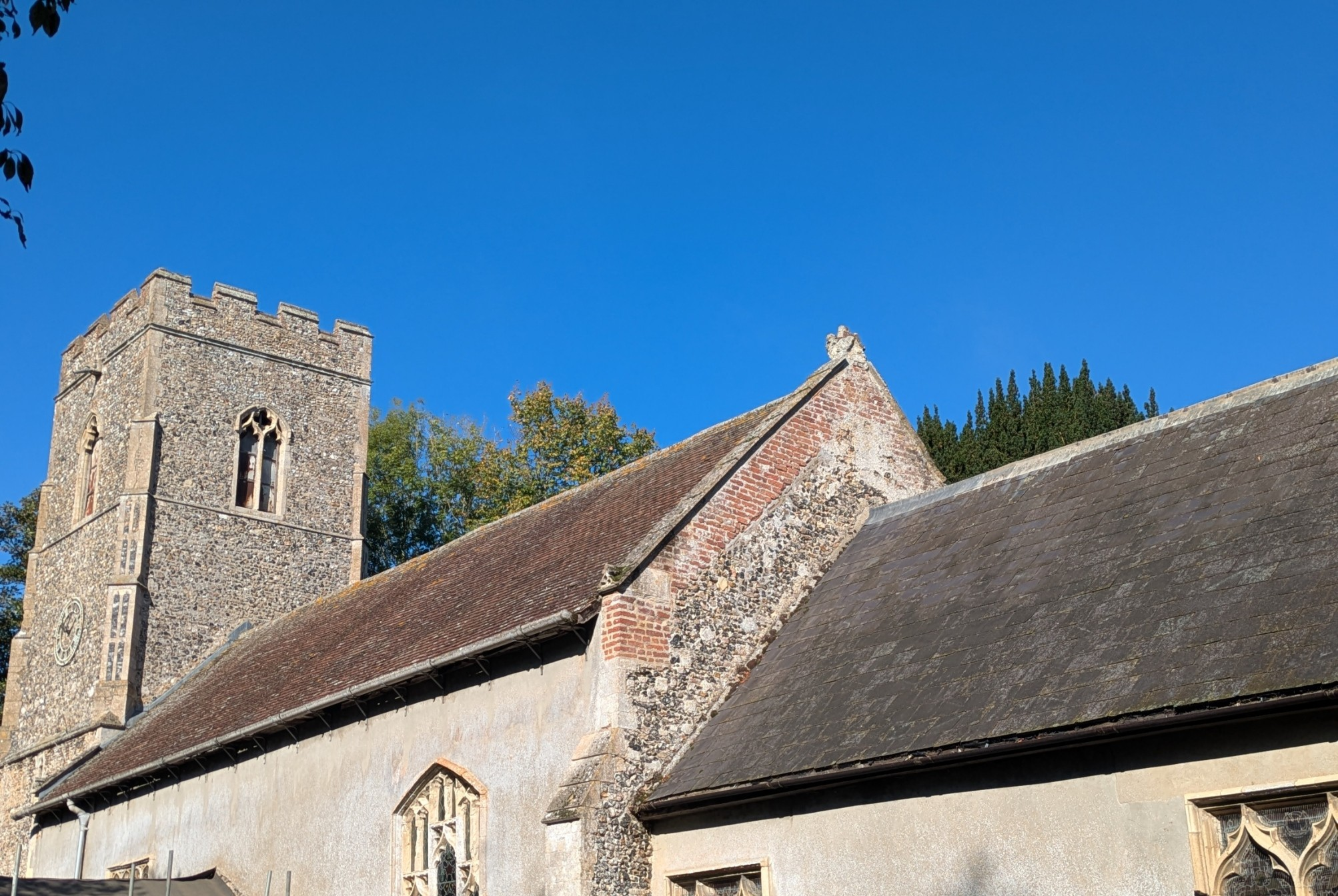
St Mary, Bedingfield, Suffolk

St Mary's Church is a Church of England parish church in the village of Bedingfield, Suffolk. It is a Grade I listed building: for its historical and architectural importance. It was first Listed on 29 July 1955: the only church in the village, and of medieval foundation. It is now on the Heritage At-Risk Register.

Bedingfield is in the district of Mid-Suffolk in the Ward of Debenham, and is situated approximately 4 miles SE of Eye, and 4 miles NW of Debenham. In the United Kingdom census of 2021, the population of the village is shown as 387 persons.

== History ==
The earliest origins of the church in Bedingfield are uncertain, but it is mentioned in the Domesday Book of 1086. This records "a 4th part of the church + 6 acres". Of interest, the same record gives the usage of the surrounding farmland to, "Wood for 164 pigs, 4 acres meadow, 12 pigs, 20 sheep". Detail in the Domesday Book lists the village name as Badingafelda.

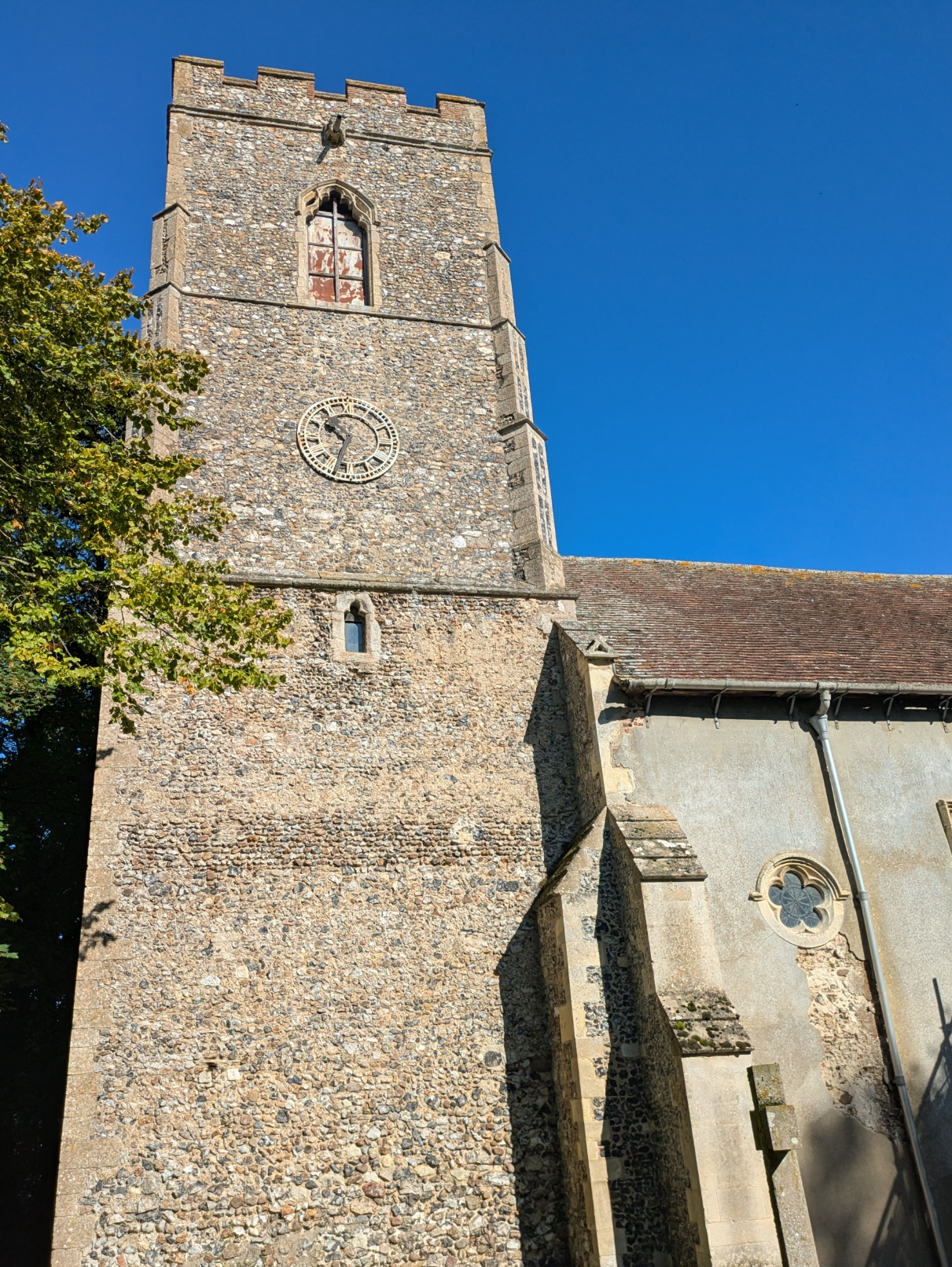
Tower with clock

The lower part of the tower is thought to be late 13th or early 14th century and is unbuttressed to belfry level. The upper section is probably late 14th century and houses a 15th-century bell; this upper section has diagonal buttresses with chequer flushwork and crenellated parapet.

The original porch (SW) is thought to have dated from 1375. From Suffolk Churches (Simon Knott), who reports that Peter Northeast and Simon Cotton recorded (so attributing to them) certain historical bequests related to Bedingfield. In particular:

'In 1375, Peter de Bedingfield left 40 shillings for “making of a window in the said church before the altar of St James”, and half a mark for making of a new porch'. D P Mortlock indicates that the porch in it present form is 15th century but that there is evidence of a previous structure. Historic England describes the porch as 'late 14th century'

Other notable benefactors include:

- In 1476, Robert Pakke left 26s 8d to the repair of the lead (roof) of Bedingfield church.
- In 1517, Robert Wolrlysch left 20 marks to the church of Bedingfield for the roofing thereof or else to “such thing as is most need to the same church”.

In April 2025, St Mary's was awarded a grant by Suffolk Historic Churches Trust for "Repairs to porch, roof, walls"

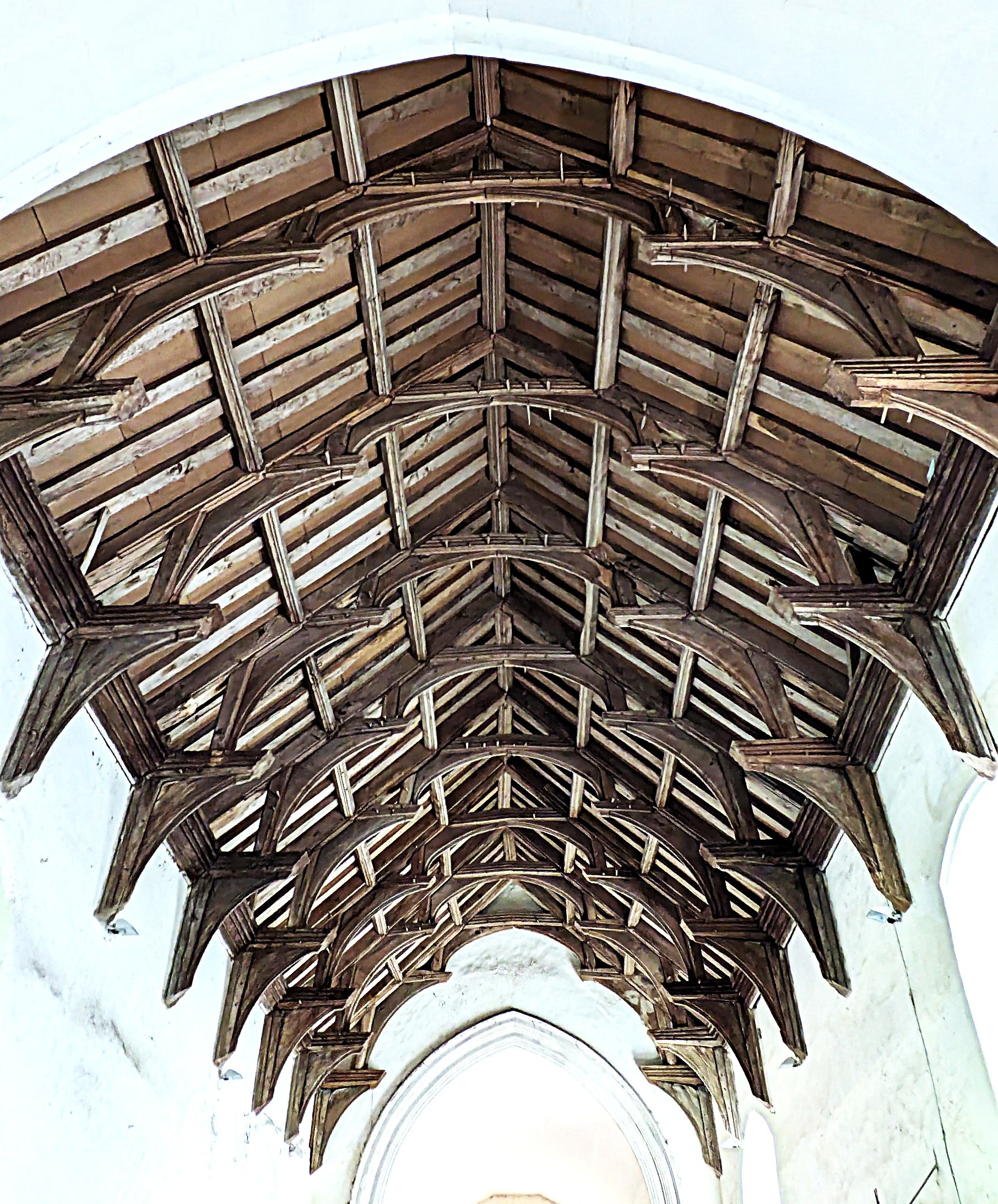
Double hammerbeam nave roof

Inside the church, the nave has an eight-bay double hammerbeam roof (dated approx.1500) which, today, has very little ornamentation. It is probable that the ends of the hammers once displayed angels or heraldic shields, but these are no longer in evidence, quite probably removed during the Puritan era, and most likely by William Dowsing (1596–1668), also known as "Smasher Dowsing" (or "Basher Dowsing"), an iconoclast.

Dowsing's Journal, dated 1643/4, has the following entry:

(Journal entry 211). 'April 3, Bedingfield. I brake down 14 superstitious pictures, one of God the Father, and 2 doves, and another of St Catherine and her wheel; and gave order to take down 3 stoneing crosses on porch, church, and chancel.'

This corresponds with D P Mortlock's mention (approx.2009) in his book, 'The Guide to Suffolk Churches'

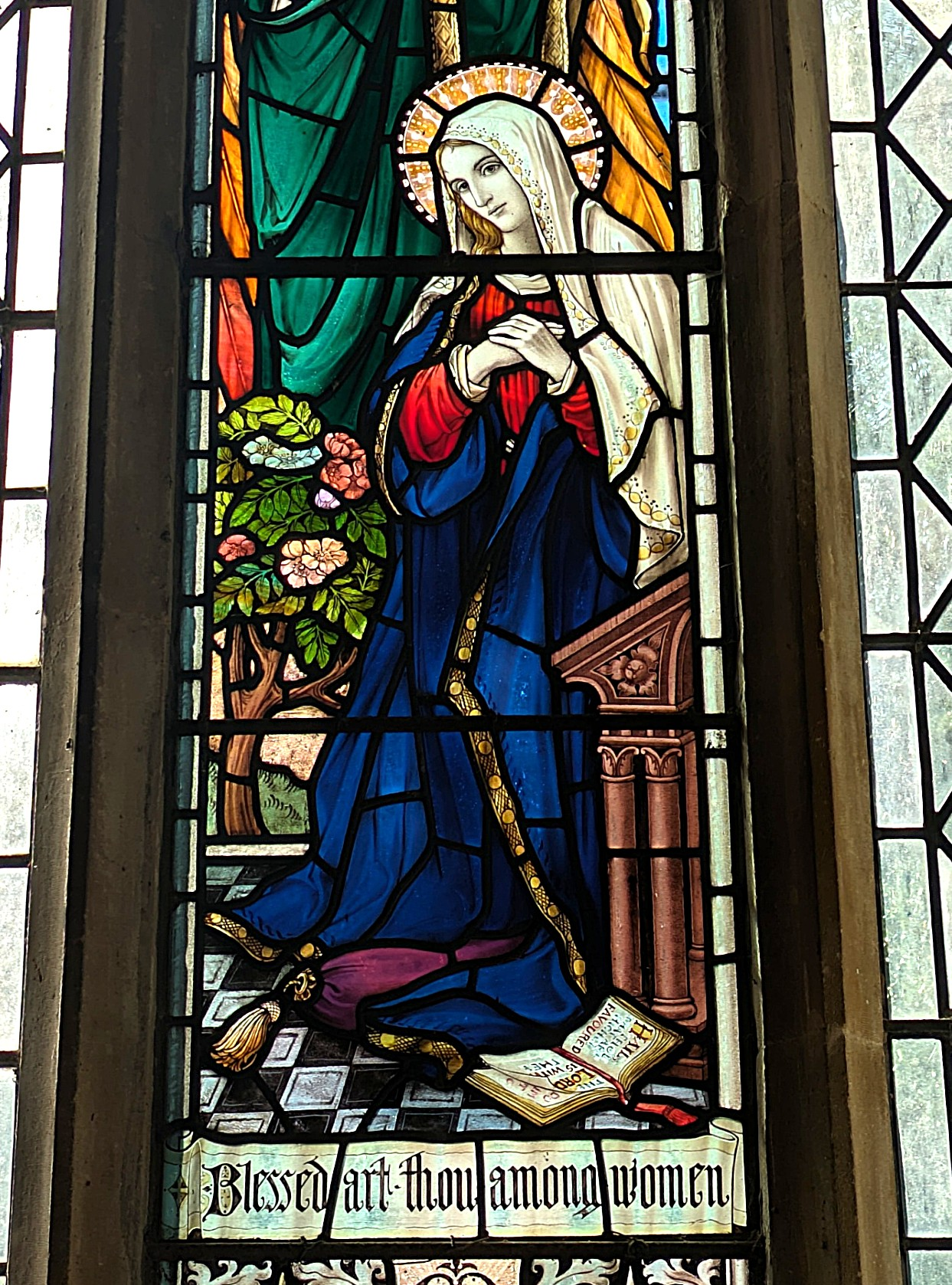
Stained glass of the Virgin Mary, "Blessed art thou among women"

".....walking up the path you will see that stumps of crosses crown the gables of nave and chancel. They are a reminder that Dowsing paid a visit in April 1643, when he gave orders for them to be taken down,"

Similarly, there is no rood screen in existence although a small arched doorway leading to a former rood stair is in the north-east nave. A part of the stairway is still visible.

Other features of note are:

- The benches (pews). These appear to have been reconstructed at some stage using the original (and quite damaged) medieval pew ends towards the south and north walls, and Jacobean ends, with 'poppyheads' towards the centre aisle. This bench reconstruction is thought to be 17th century. The remaining nave benches, lectern, pulpit, and chancel stalls are all 19th century
- The altar (an oak table) sits in the chancel beneath the large Victorian east window (the principal east glazing above the altar). The east window is a prominent feature paid for by the local Bedingfield family and depicts saints (variously described as St John, St Helen and St James). The glazing is thought to be by William Miller c. 1850s.
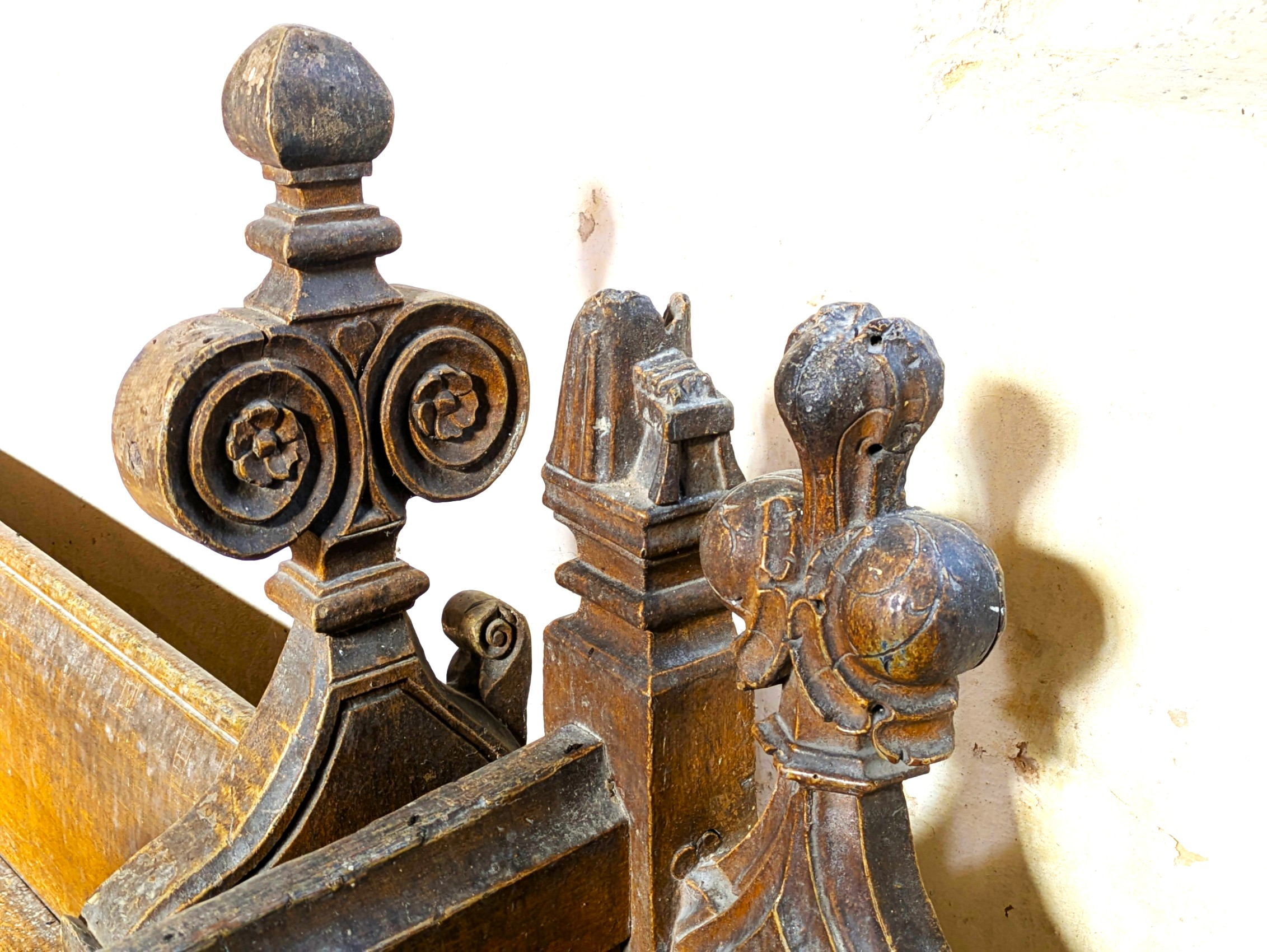
- Ornate carved bench end
  The font is an octagonal bowl, probably 15th century, but stands on an earlier square base and shaft.
- A large rectangular wooden chest which is over 7 feet in length, sheathed and banded in iron and with the lid in two halves. This is thought to be 14th or early 15th century.
- A funerary hatchment for the funeral of John James Bedingfield (1773-1853) on the south chancel wall.
- A Vestry dated 1834 was built onto the north of the nave.

The church was substantially restored in 1871–72.

=== The Bedingfield Family ===
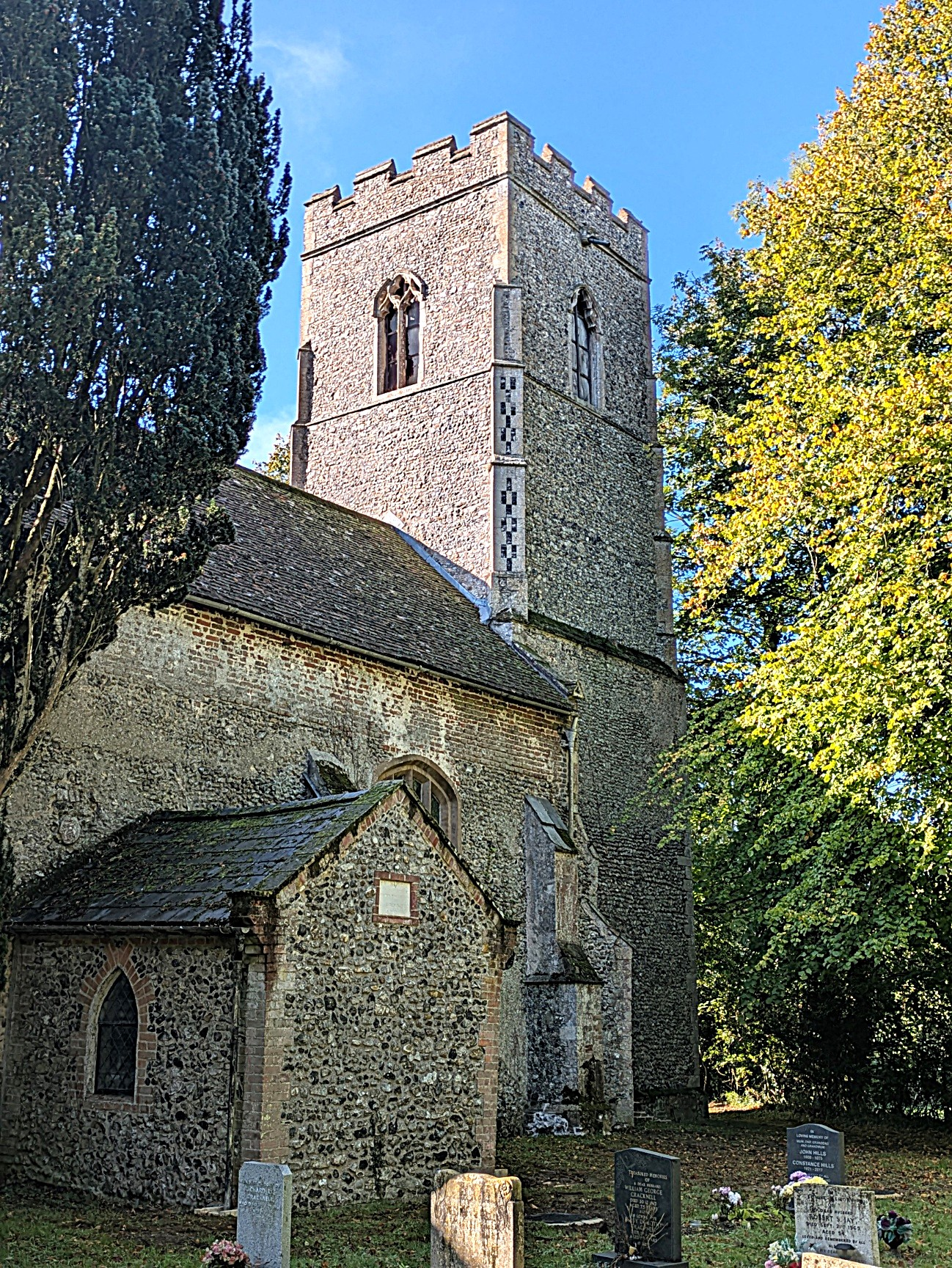
Church from the north-side graveyard

This family has long connections with the church, living at Flemings Hall from about 1371 to 1929. The family has provided many benefactors to the church and a number of Rectors. There have been several appointments between c.1300 and 1833; the parish leaflet and local histories note at least six Bedingfields held the living and many family burials occur under the chancel/porch.

The Rectors included:

- Rev. John Bedingfield — 1683–1729: recorded as being appointed as Vicar of Bedingfield and Rector of Hedenham. He was also responsible for the 1710 re-building of Ditchingham Hall in Norfolk.
- Rev. James Bedingfield -- 1809-1878: recorded as Rector of Bedingfield and Vicar of Debenham.

=== Memorials of war ===
The Village War Memorial sits in the churchyard on the intersection of two pathways leading to the main porch and the priest's door into the chancel. it is Grade II Listed. It is made of Portland stone and stands approx.11 high, The head is a Celtic cross with carved interlace patterns. It commemorates 14 men who gave their lives in the Great War of 1914-18.

Names on Memorial

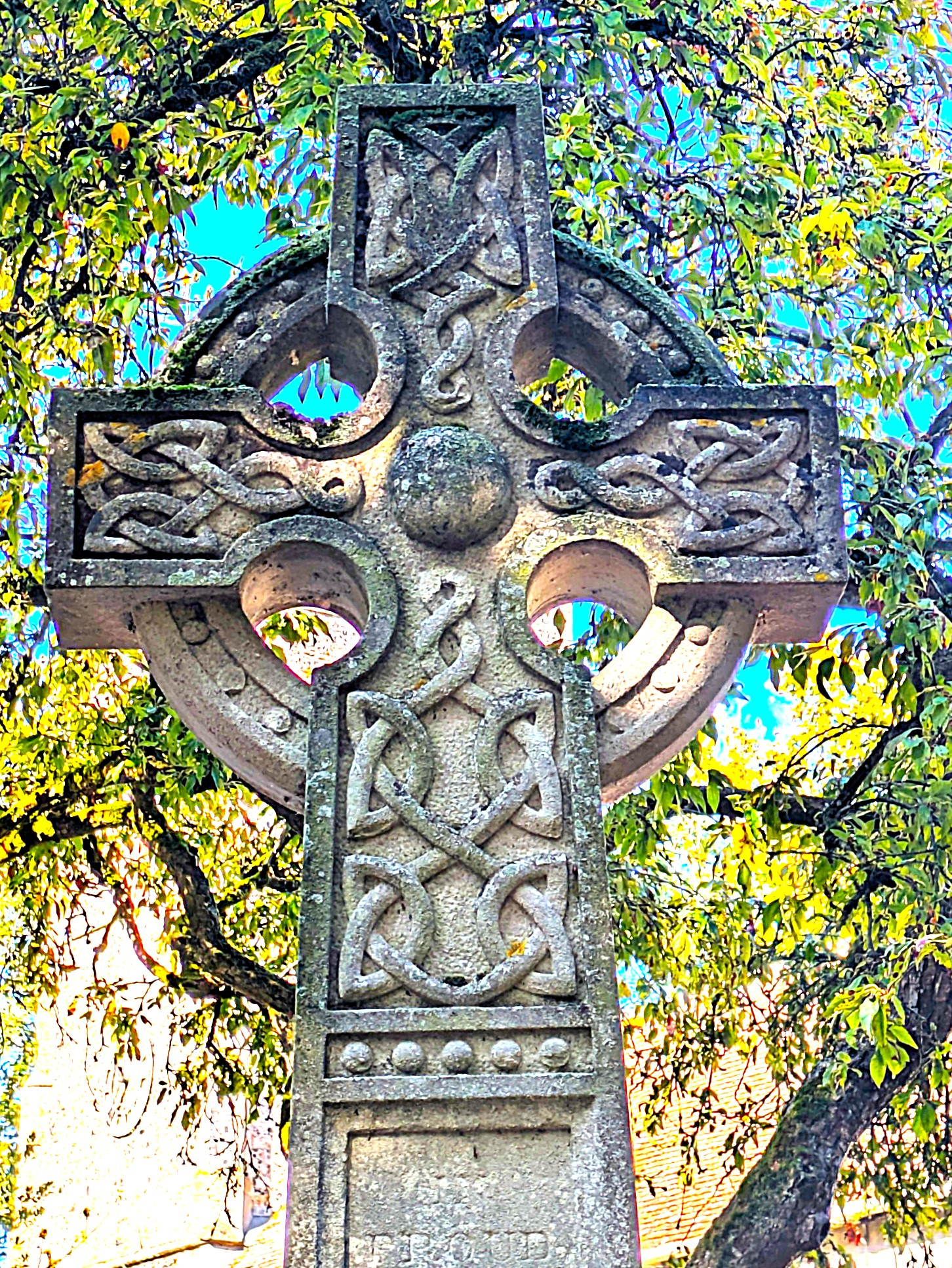
War Memorial - World War I

Blake, Victor
Chambers, Albert
Garrard, Frederick
Gedney, Hubert
Harvey, James
Hillen, George
Hillen, Herbert
Hillen, Stanley
Perkins, William
Stammers, Frederick
Ward, Charles
Ward, John
Ward, William
Whitton, John

The Memorial was built by Mr EE Saunders of Ipswich, who erected many war memorials in Suffolk, and was unveiled in March 1920.

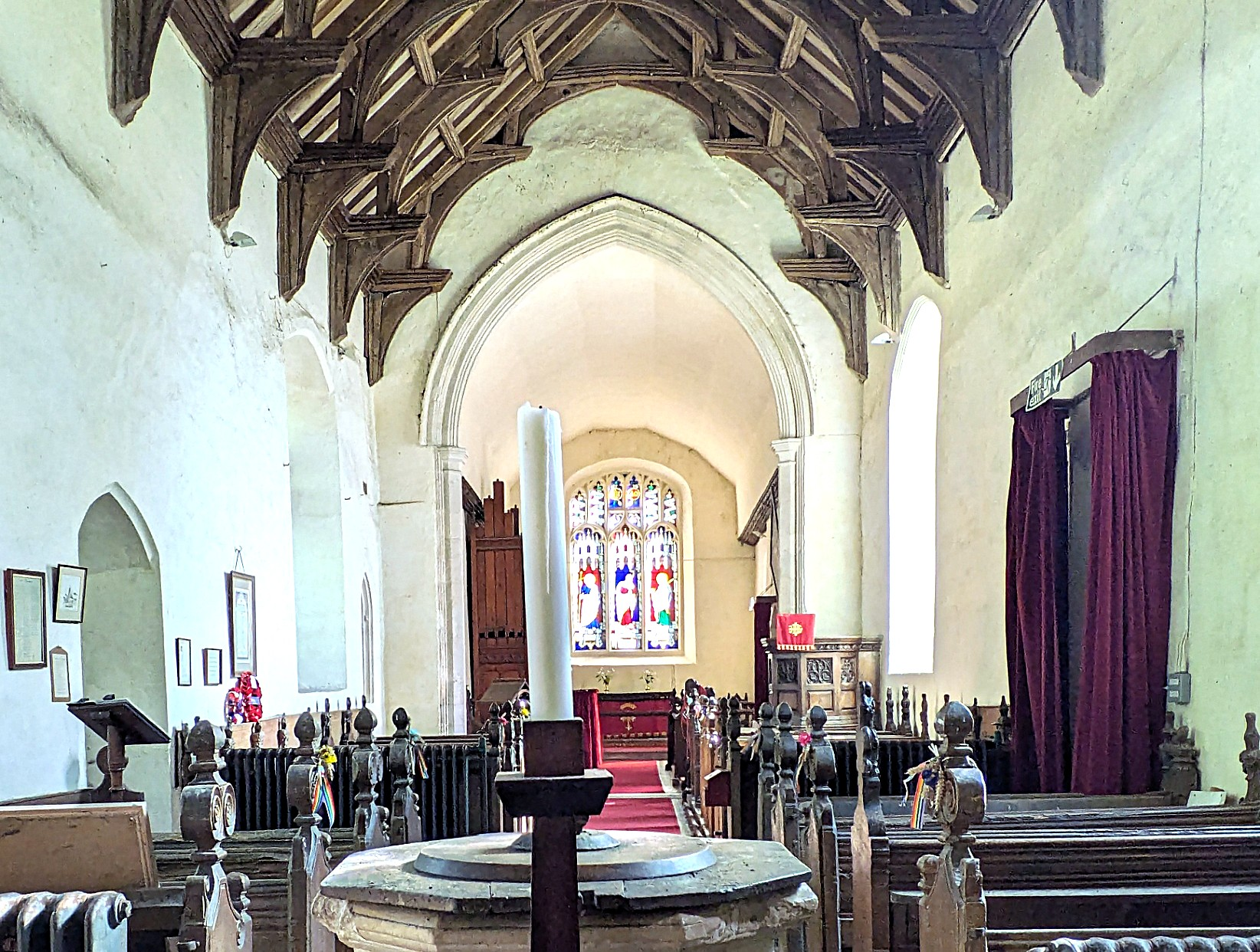
Nave and chancel viewed from the baptistery

==== The Church Clock ====
This was installed on the south-facing centre section of the church tower on 13 May 1920, It was paid for by subscription of local Parishioners in memory of those men who lost their lives in the Great War. The clock was Manufactured by Gillett & Johnston of Croydon and is thought to have cost about £50. The installation work (stonework, joinery etc) was undertaken by local people. It has a face diameter of 4' 6" and a striking bell mechanism.

=== Organ ===
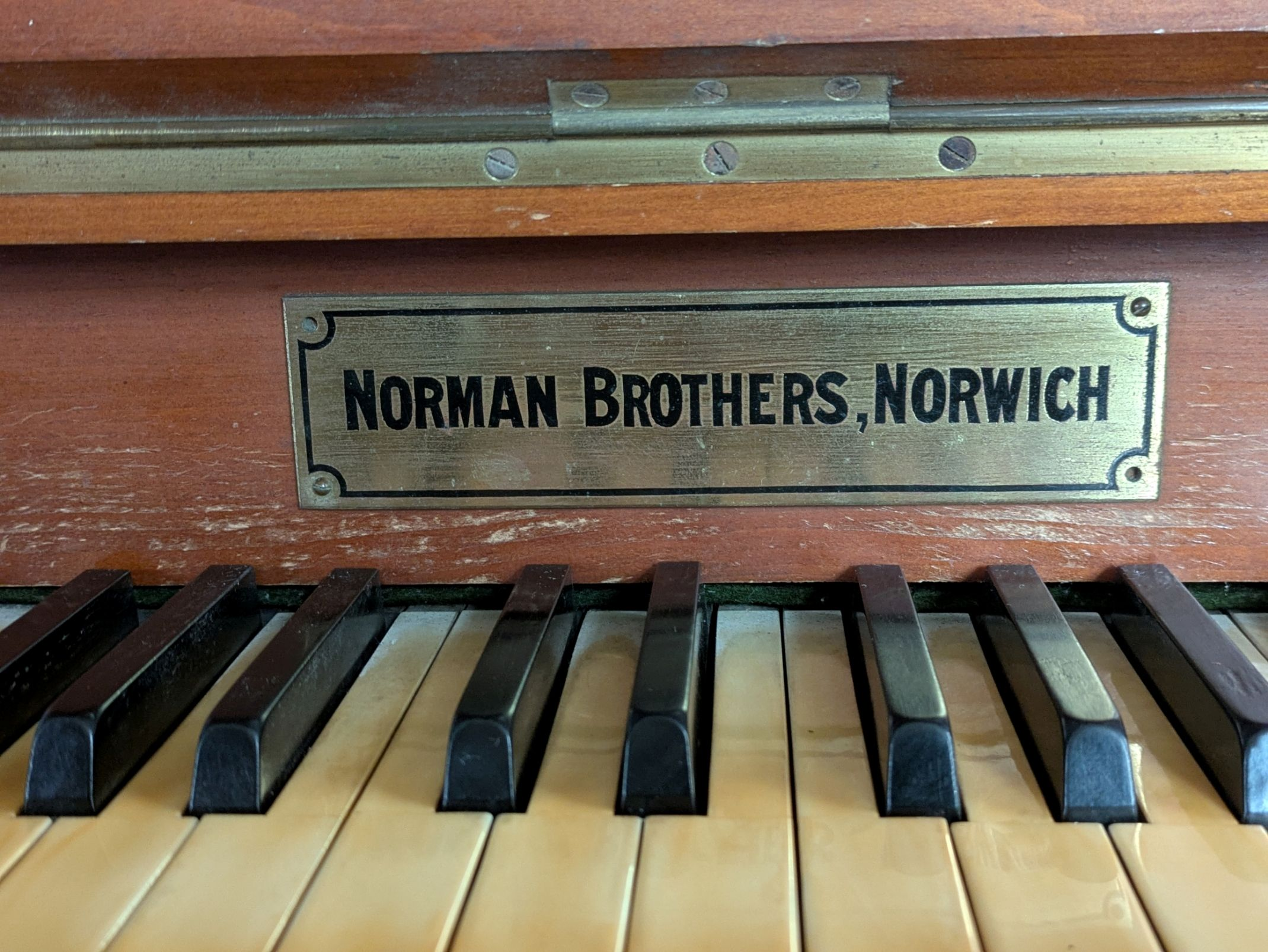
Organ manufacturer's name-plate

The Church has a two manual + pedal pipe organ built by Norman Bros. (1870-1887), later becoming Norman & Beard (1887-1916), which was a notable pipe organ manufacturer based in Norwich. They were active until 1916 when they merged with William Hill & Sons of London. The date of installation of the Bedingfield instrument is thought to be 1887.

== Present day ==
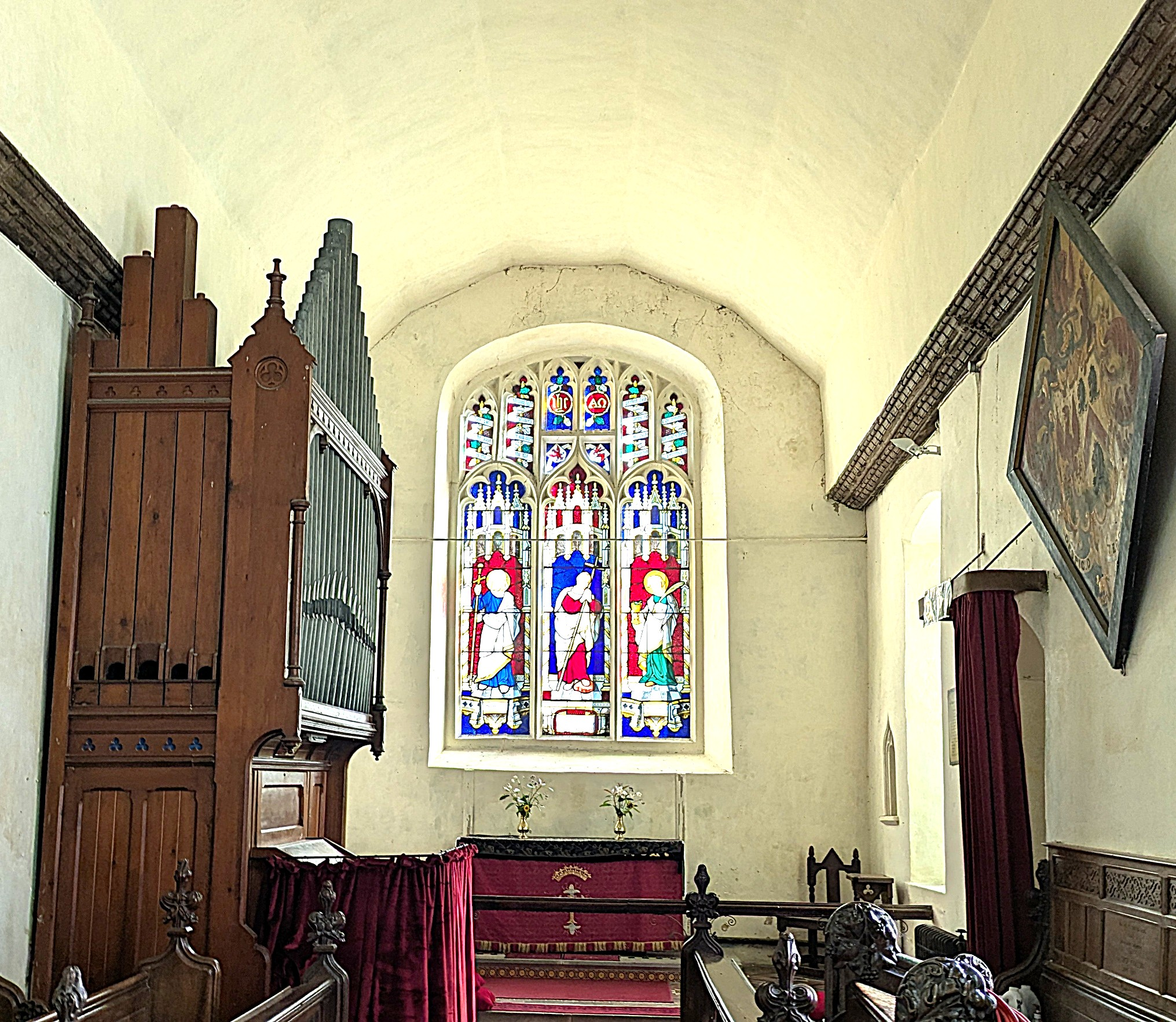
Chancel - with organ (left) and funerary hatchment (right)

There have been recent significant repair works (completed Autumn 2025) to re-roof and replace timbers in the south porch, repairs to walls, and to renew sub-surface drainage around the building. Much of the funding required was raised locally, including generous individual donations, together a significant grant from the Suffolk Historic Churches Trust.

St Mary Bedingfield is a Parish Church in the Anglican Diocese of St Edmundsbury & Ipswich and the Deanery of Hartismere and Hoxne. It is part of the Benefice of Eye, comprising three churches:

- Ss Peter & Paul, Eye
- St Michael and All Angels, Occold
- St Mary, Bedingfield

The most recent Rector of the Benefice is Revd. Dr. Guy Sumpter who retired in November 2026.

There are normally two Sunday services each month at Bedingfield: Holy Communion at 9.15 am on the first and third Sundays.

St Mary's is open to visitors daily from approx. 10 am to 3.30 pm

== See also ==
- Grade I listed buildings in Suffolk
