= St Michael and All Angels' Church, Occold =

Historic English parish church

Coordinates: 52°17′37″N 1°09′35″E

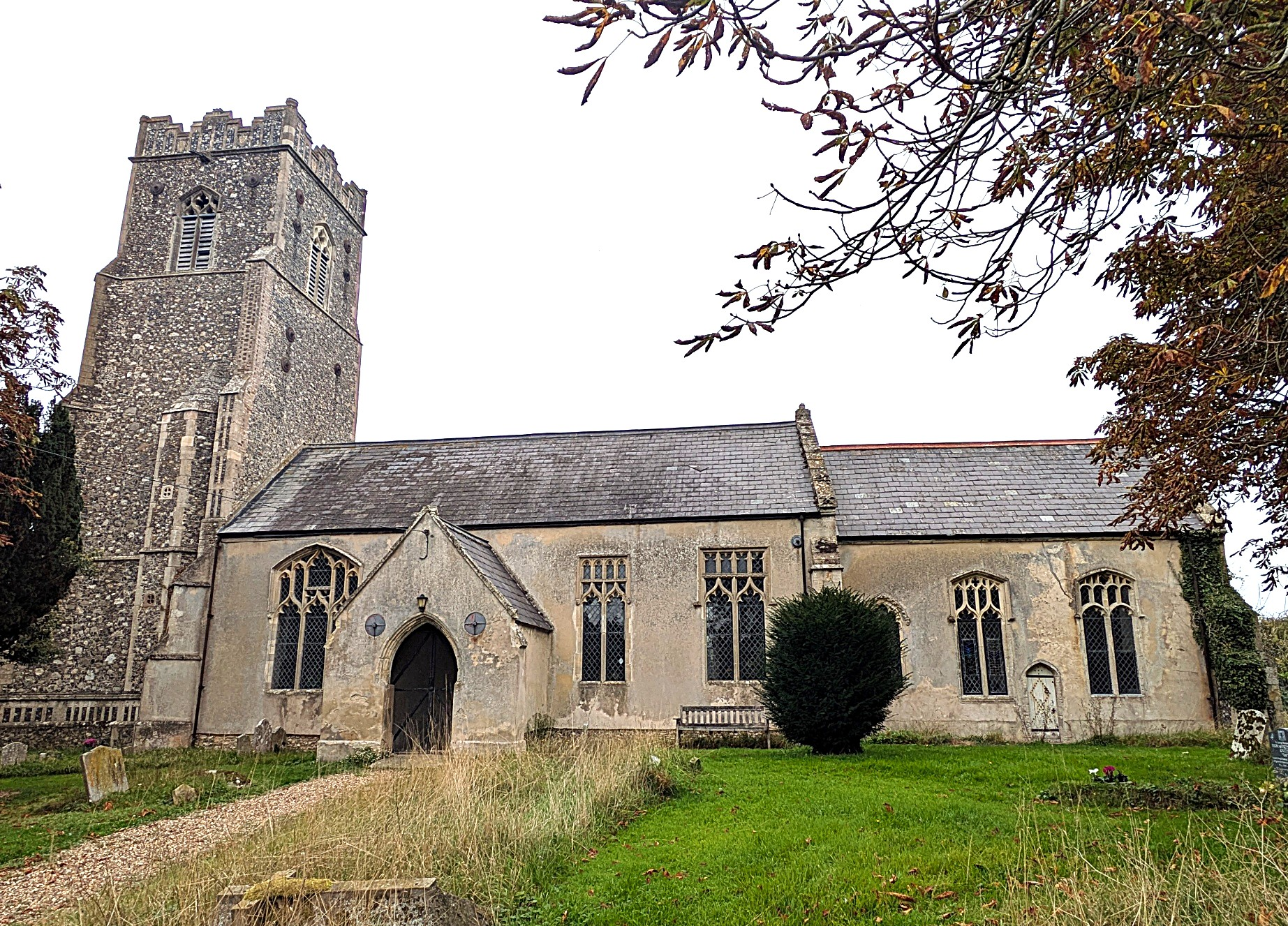
St Michael's Church, Occold

St Michael and All Angels Church (often called St Michael's Church) is a Church of England parish church in the village of Occold, Suffolk. It is one of two places of worship in the village, the other being Jubilee Baptist Church. St Michael's is a Grade II* listed building for its historical and architectural importance.

== History ==
=== High medieval ===
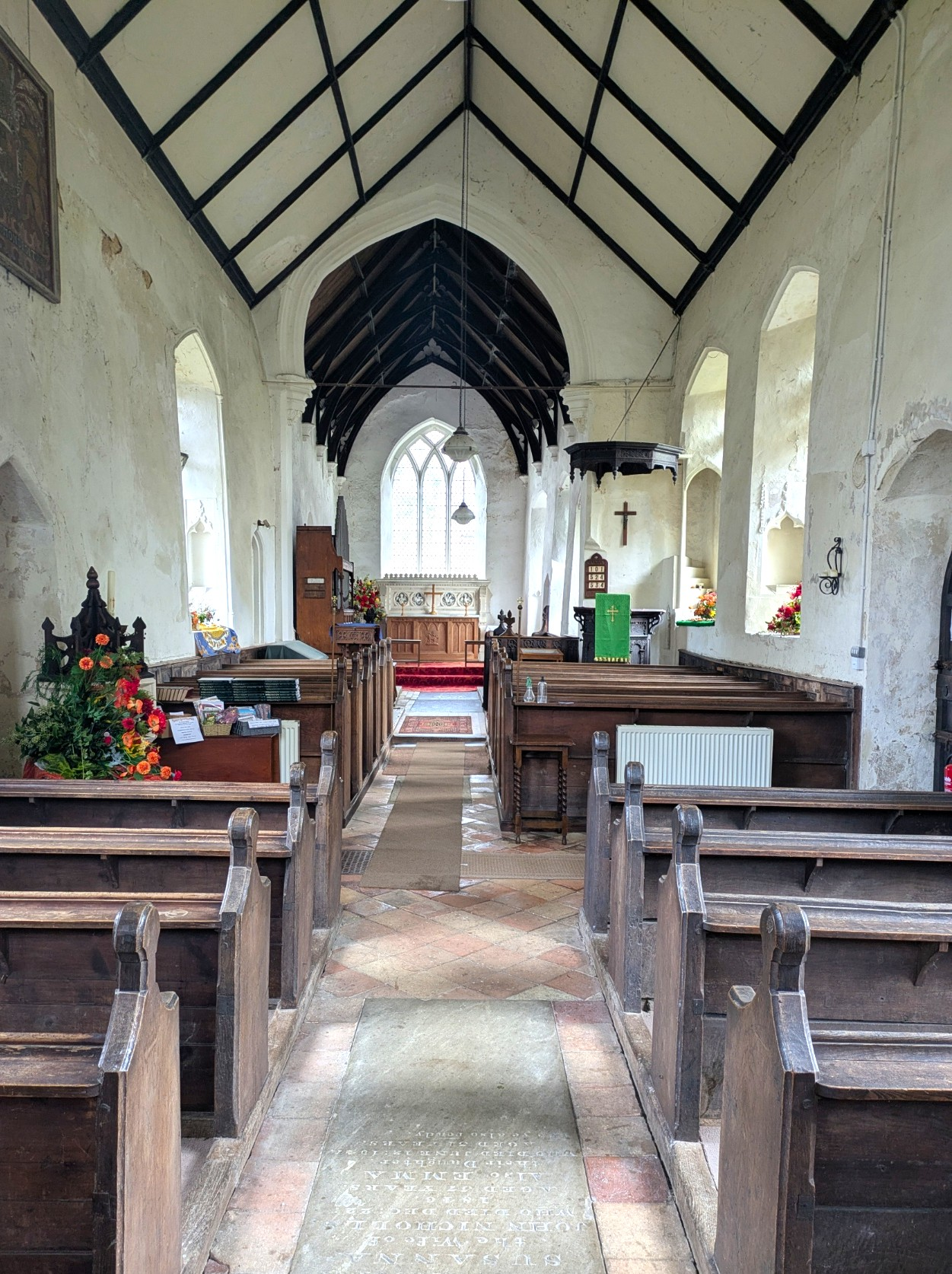
Nave and chancel, showing the offset of the nave arch

Occold was a settlement recorded in the Domesday Book of 1086, in the hundred of Hartismere and the county of Suffolk. It is listed as consisting of 42 households. The owners of various sections of this community are listed as:

- King William
- Robert Malet
- Abbey of (Bury) St Edmunds
- Hugh de Montfort
- Ralph of Limésy
- Bishop Odo of Bayeux

The name of the village was recorded as "Acholt", deriving from two words from Old English, ac ("oak") and holt ("wood"), meaning "oak wood".

The Domesday entry appears to indicate that there may have been two churches at that time (1086):

- Church + 8 acres land, 0.5 plough
- Church + 12 acres land

Nothing remains of the original Norman church according to the Suffolk County heritage record .

It is thought that the second chapel was located at Chapel Field, Benningham which is a little under a mile to the east of Occold. This chapel ceased to be used by 1291 and is said to have been only a wooden shed in `horsefields'

=== Late medieval development (13th–15th centuries) ===
There is reference to remnants of 13th-century work, namely the nave having "13th century north and south doorways with plain 2-centred arches". The chancel also has a small 12/13th-century window (north).

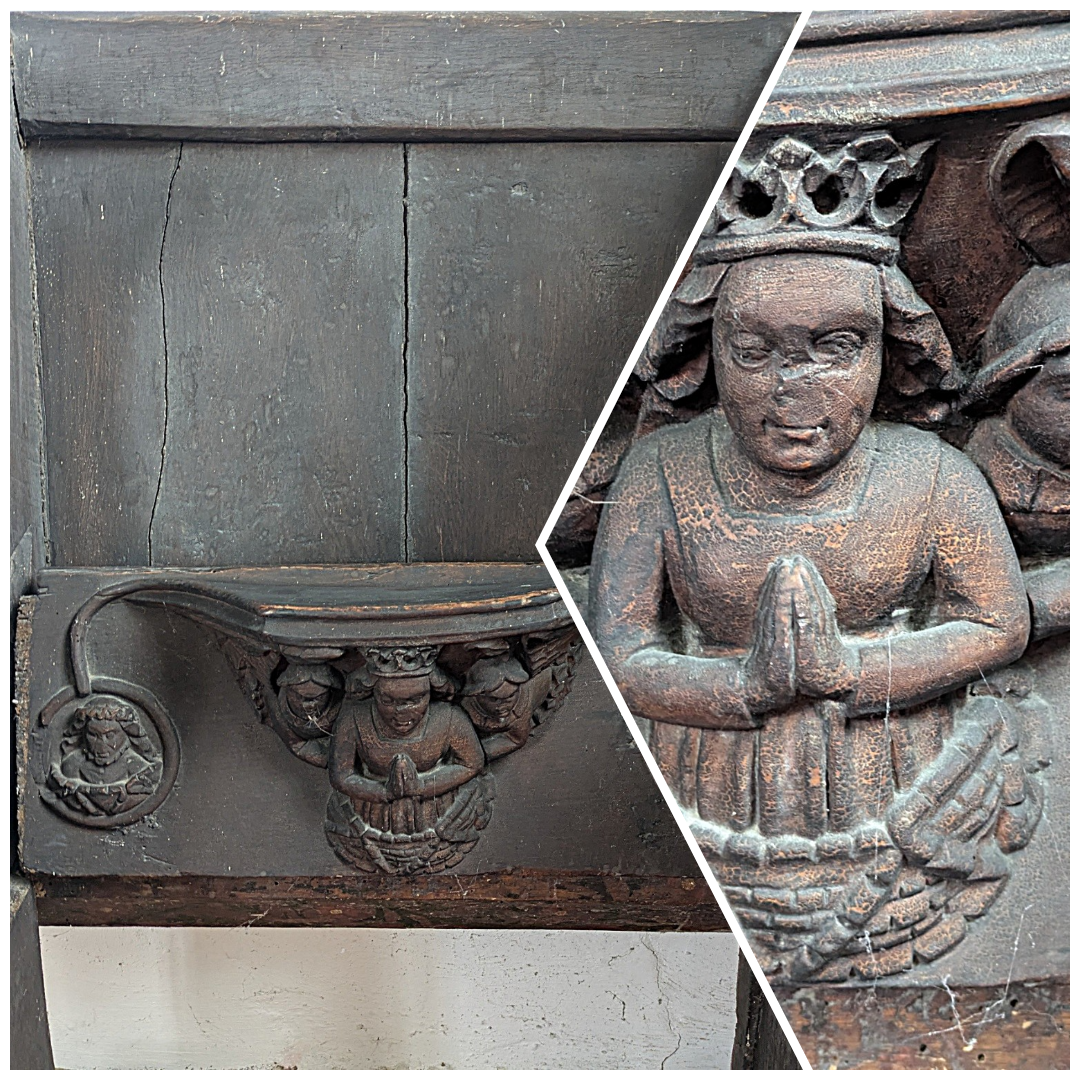
Misericord underside carving of Virgin Mary and angels

Beside the altar on the north is a very fine misericord (a seat/stall with a flap which, when placed upright, displays a carved figure on the underside). The carving on the Occold misericord depicts what is thought to be the Virgin May, crowned and flanked by angels. The date of this is unknown.

Apart from the Early English south doorway, the 15th century saw a general rebuilding of the whole of Occold church. Evidence of this is in the type of the windows which are mainly in the Perpendicular style, common from the late 14th century up until the English Reformation of 1534, and thereafter until the 17th century in modified forms.

From Suffolk Churches (Simon Knott), reports that Peter Northeast and Simon Cotton recorded (so attributing to them) an historical bequest by one William Osmond, in 1426, of 40 shillings facturam novi campanile (roughly translated as "to make a new bell or [bell-tower]"). Other sources confirm that the tower is 15th century and built in four stages. The four stages are clearly visible from the outside, as is the west door, which is no longer in use and sealed from the inside.

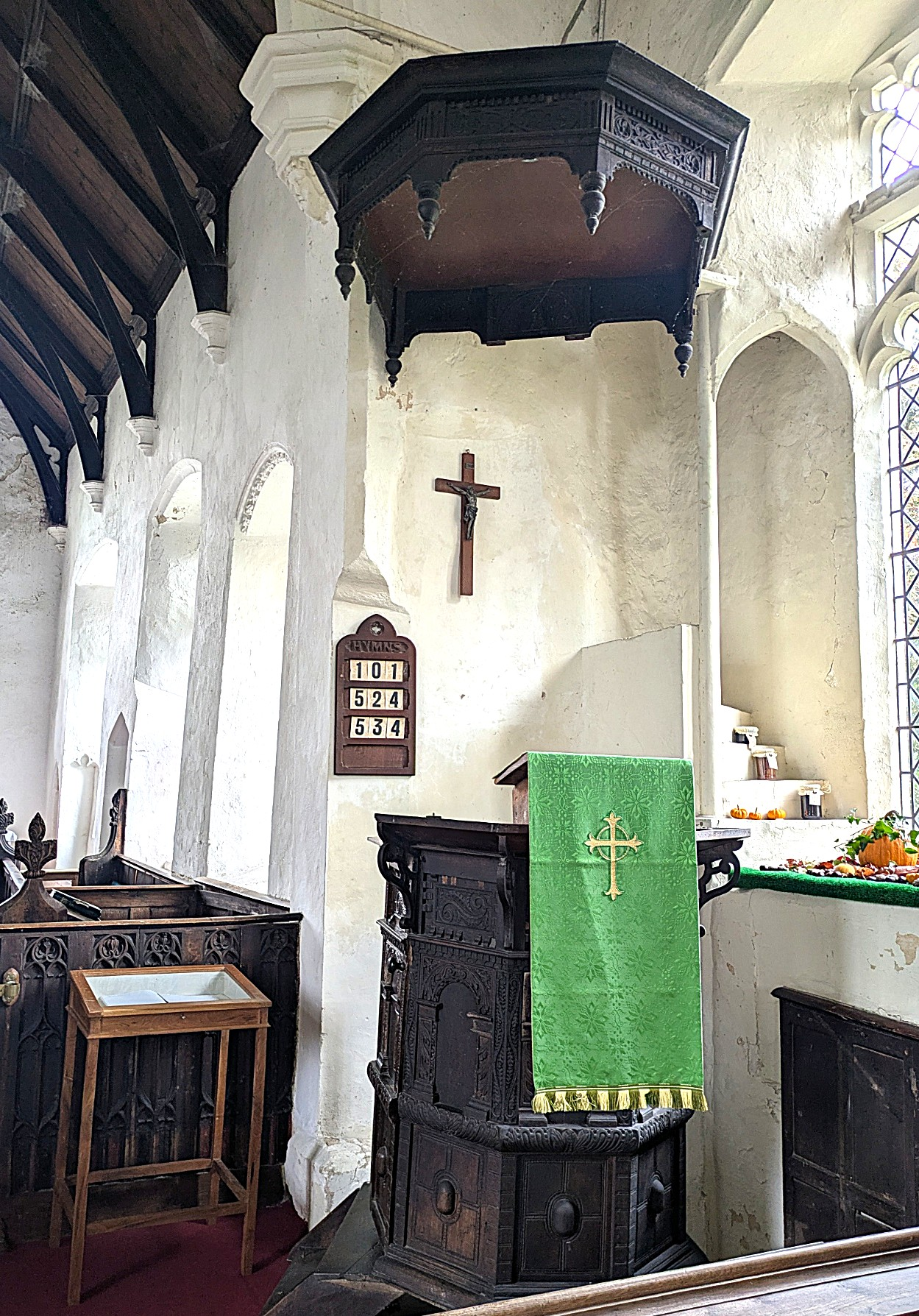
Pulpit with tester above and south rood stair on the right

=== Post-Reformation ===
It is certain that, in common with many churches, especially in Cambridgeshire and Suffolk, the work of the Puritan iconoclast William Dowsing (1596–1668), also known as "Smasher Dowsing", is evident. Dowsing's journal, dated 1643/4, has the following entry:

(Journal entry no.) 267. Ockold [Occold], Aug. Divers superstitious pictures were broke. I came, and there was Jesus, Mary, and St. Lawrence with his gridiron, and Peter's keys. Churchwarden promised to send 5s. to Mr. Oales, before Michaelmas. 5s. p[ai]d m[emoran]d[um].

The identity or position of "Mr Oales" isn't known for certain, but it has been suggested that he was Alexander Ouldis of Thorndon, acting as Dowsing's deputy. Nevertheless, it seems that the icon removal work was completed to the satisfaction of Dowsing and duly paid for (the sum of 5 shillings), before Michaelmas. (29th September).

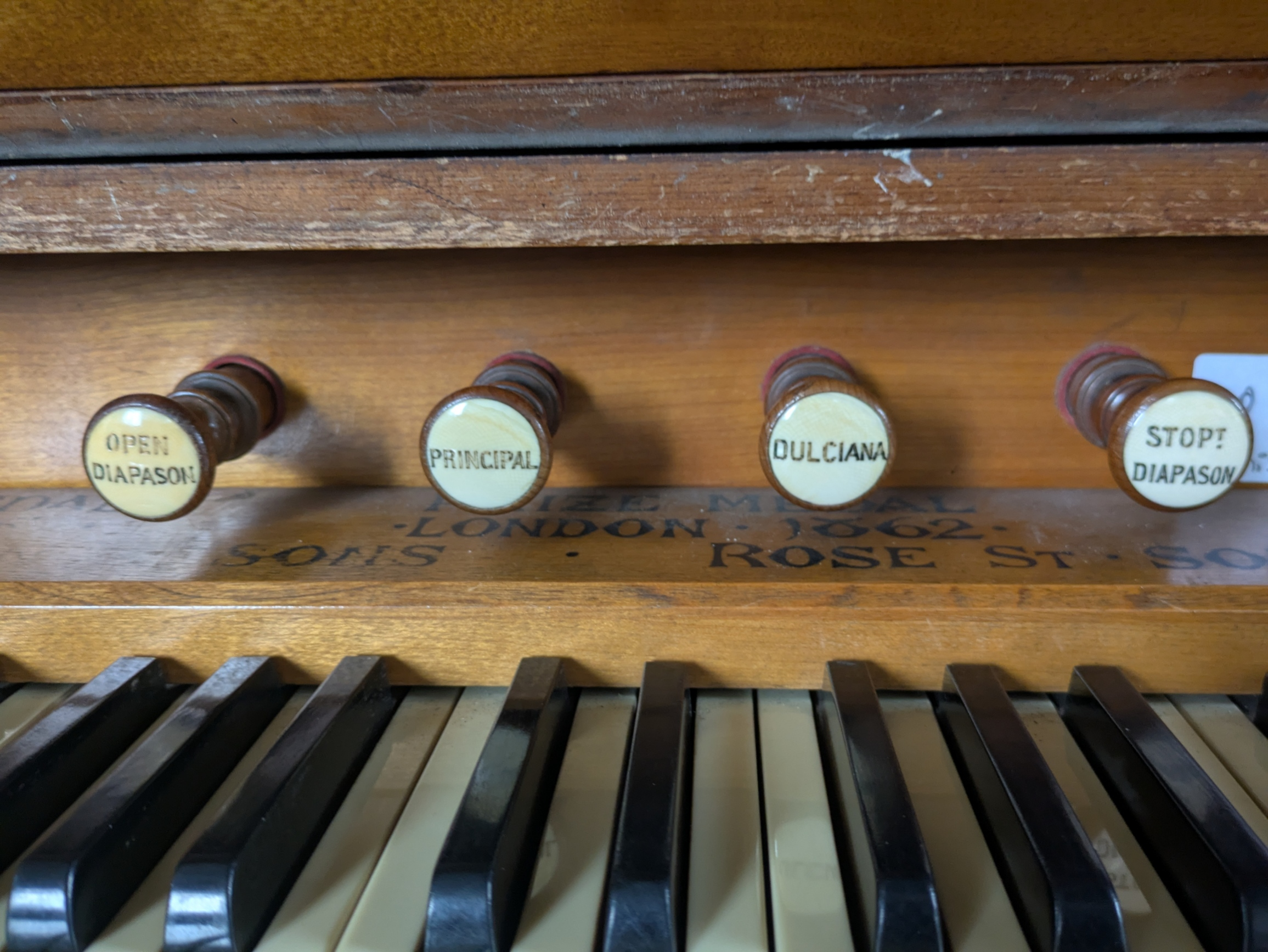
Organ keyboard and draw stops (one manual + pedals)

There is no rood screen, but there is evidence of stairs to a rood loft, which suggests that there was one (or intended to be one) at some stage. Whether such loft was removed by the Puritans isn't documented. On the south side, beside the pulpit, there are steps leading up from the wide windowsill through a small arch. There is also the shape of a doorway on the north side, indicating that the rood loft may have been accessible from both sides.

Viewed from the outside (north), the buttress of the nave, adjacent to the chancel, has an diagonal enlargement/protrusion to the west side which is likely the encasement for the north rood stair which was "external", as distinct from the internal stair on the opposite (south) side.

The chancel is offset slightly to the north of the main axis of the building, possibly to accommodate an altar against the south wall at some time past. The south rood stair sits within the enlarged offset section so created.

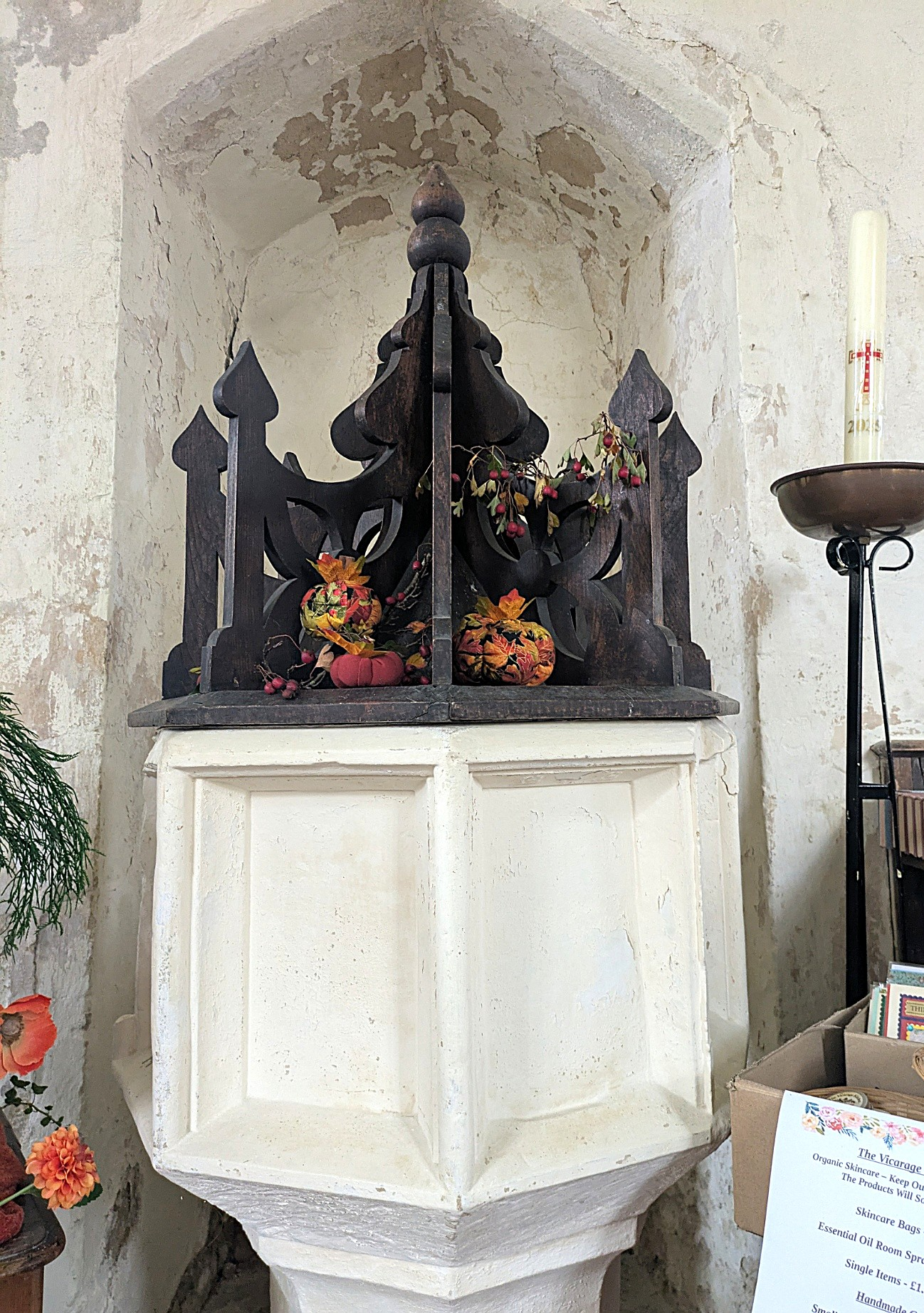
Octagonal baptismal font

The octagonal baptismal font is likely 15th century and is of chalk-stone. although much of the original carving no longer exists. Round its base are four Victorian tiles depicting the four Evangelist's symbols. The font is now positioned in front of the north door (in the nave). Above this door is the royal coat of arms of Charles II.

The pulpit is of the Stuart era (initialled and dated 1620). The tester (sounding board) over the pulpit has pendants and carved panels below the cornice. Behind the pulpit and in the south wall is a 14th century piscina.

=== 19th-century restorations, Victorian era, and later ===
The church organ was installed in 1862, the instrument being made by Henry Bevington & Sons of London (fl. 1794–1941). It has a single manual plus pedalboard and four stops, and is free-standing with 19 metal display pipes within a moderately carved Gothic pine case.

Both nave and chancel were re-roofed together with "extensive alterations" in 1854 with further restoration in 1877. Most of the windows are in Perpendicular style, suggesting that they were renewed in the 19th or early 20th century. Similarly, the porch has been heavily restored.

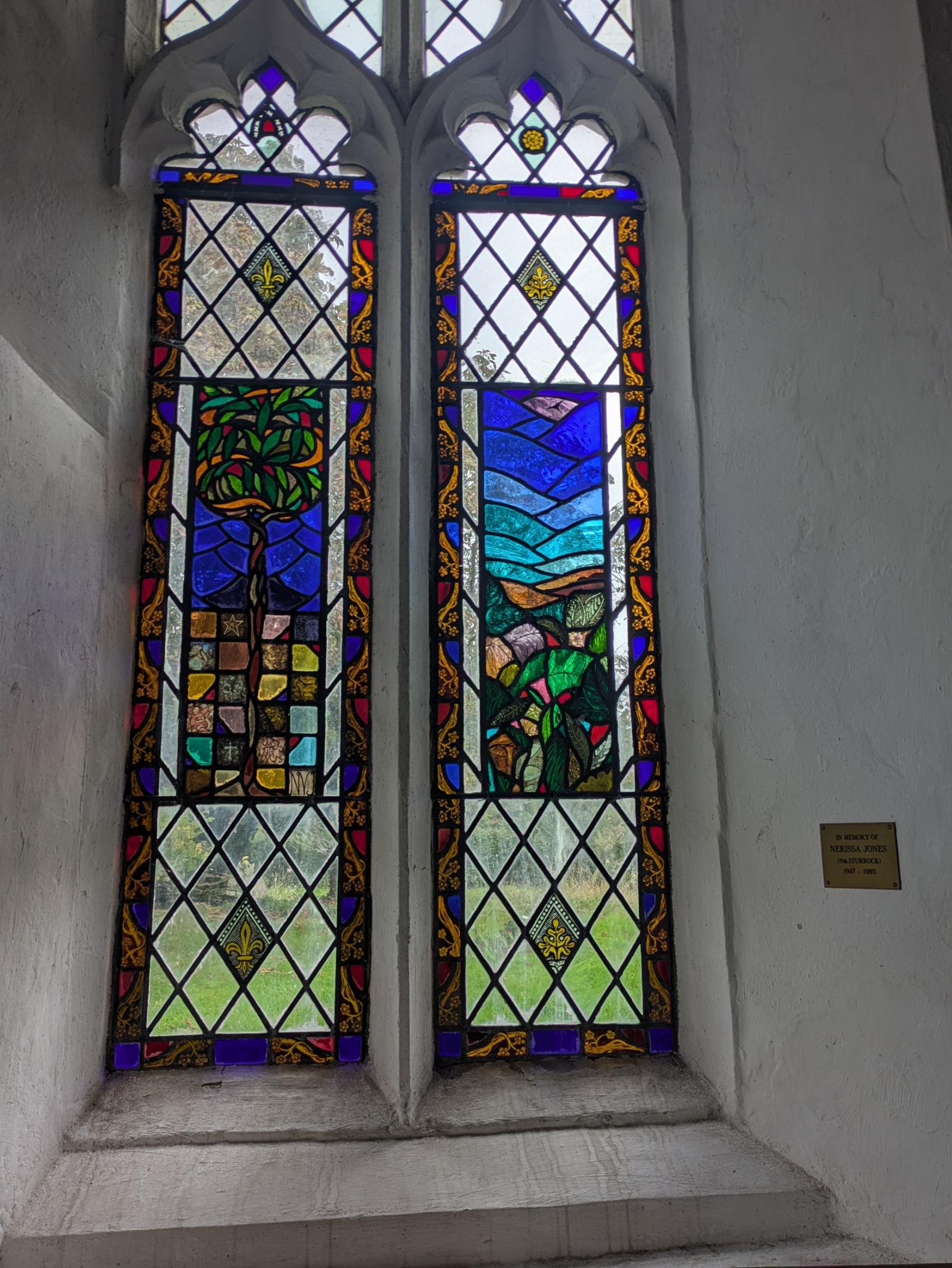
Stained glass window

The altar is of oak, bearing the inscription, "Agnus Dei qui tollis peccata mundi misereri nobis" (O Lamb of God that takest away the sin of the world, have mercy upon us). The marble and stone reredos behind the altar displays the four Evangelist's symbols. This was erected in 1854.

The stained glass windows were installed in November 1995. They were donated by the Sturrock family, in memory of their sister Nerissa Jones, who died in November 1985. Designed and made by made by the artist Lou Spencer, they are described by Spencer thus: "The windows were to fit in with the special atmosphere of the church, rather quiet and mysterious ...".

== Present day ==
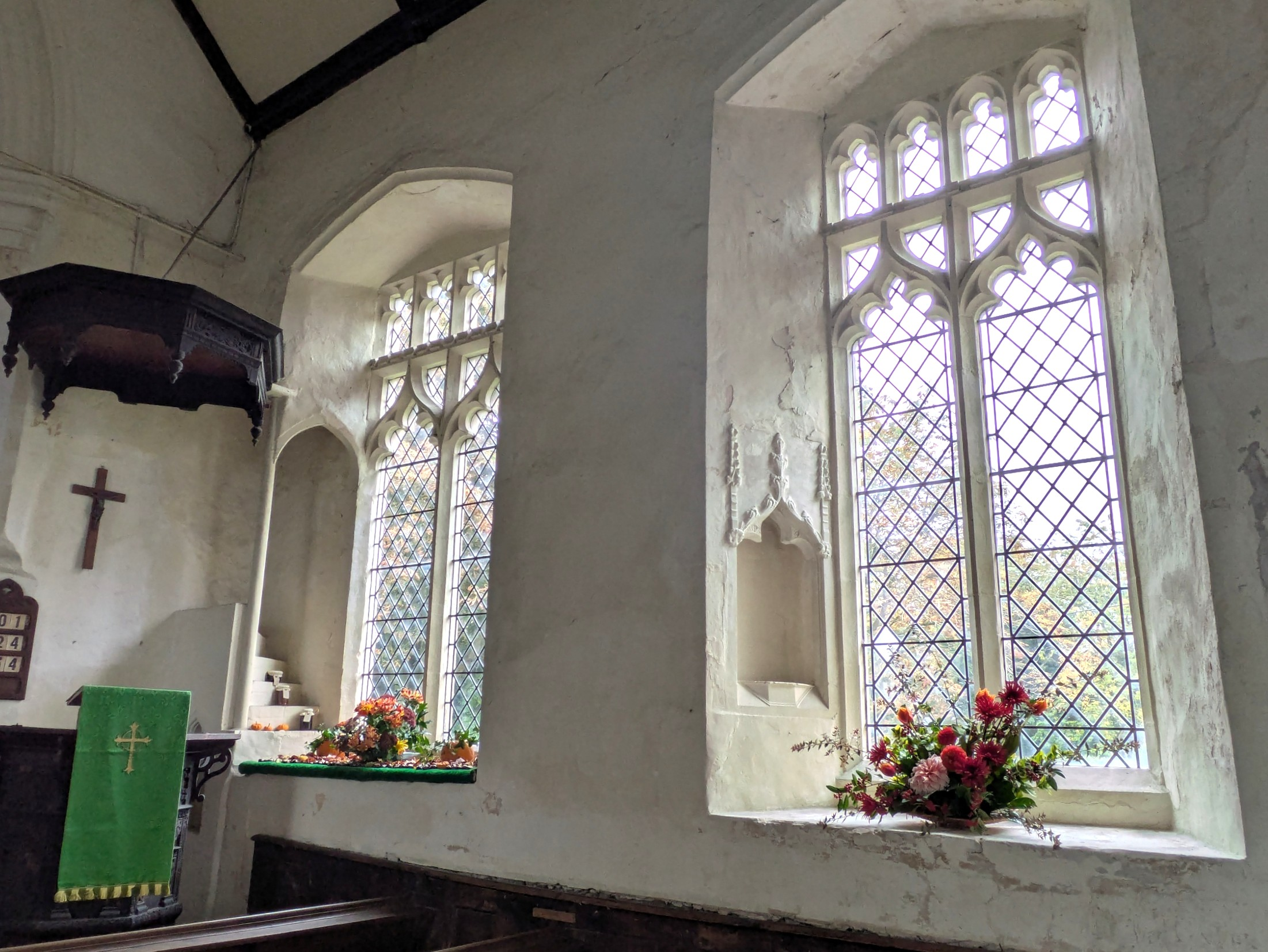
Nave with pulpit and south rood stair

St Michael and All Angels is a parish church in the Anglican Diocese of St Edmundsbury & Ipswich and the Deanery of Hartismere and Hoxne. It is part of the Benefice of Eye, comprising three churches:

- Ss Peter & Paul, Eye
- St Michael and All Angels, Occold
- St Mary's Church, Bedingfield

The most recent Rector of the Benefice is Revd. Dr. Guy Sumpter who retired in November 2026.

There are normally two Sunday services each month at Occold: Eucharist at 9.15 am on the second and fourth Sundays. However, there may be occasional variations depending on the benefice service rota.

St Michael's is open to visitors daily from approx. dawn to dusk.
