= Inverkeithing =

Town in Scotland

Coordinates: 56°01′55″N 3°23′49″W

Inverkeithing: Scottish Gaelic: Inbhir Chèitinn; Scots: Innerkethyn; Nickname: Divit
- Town and Royal Burgh
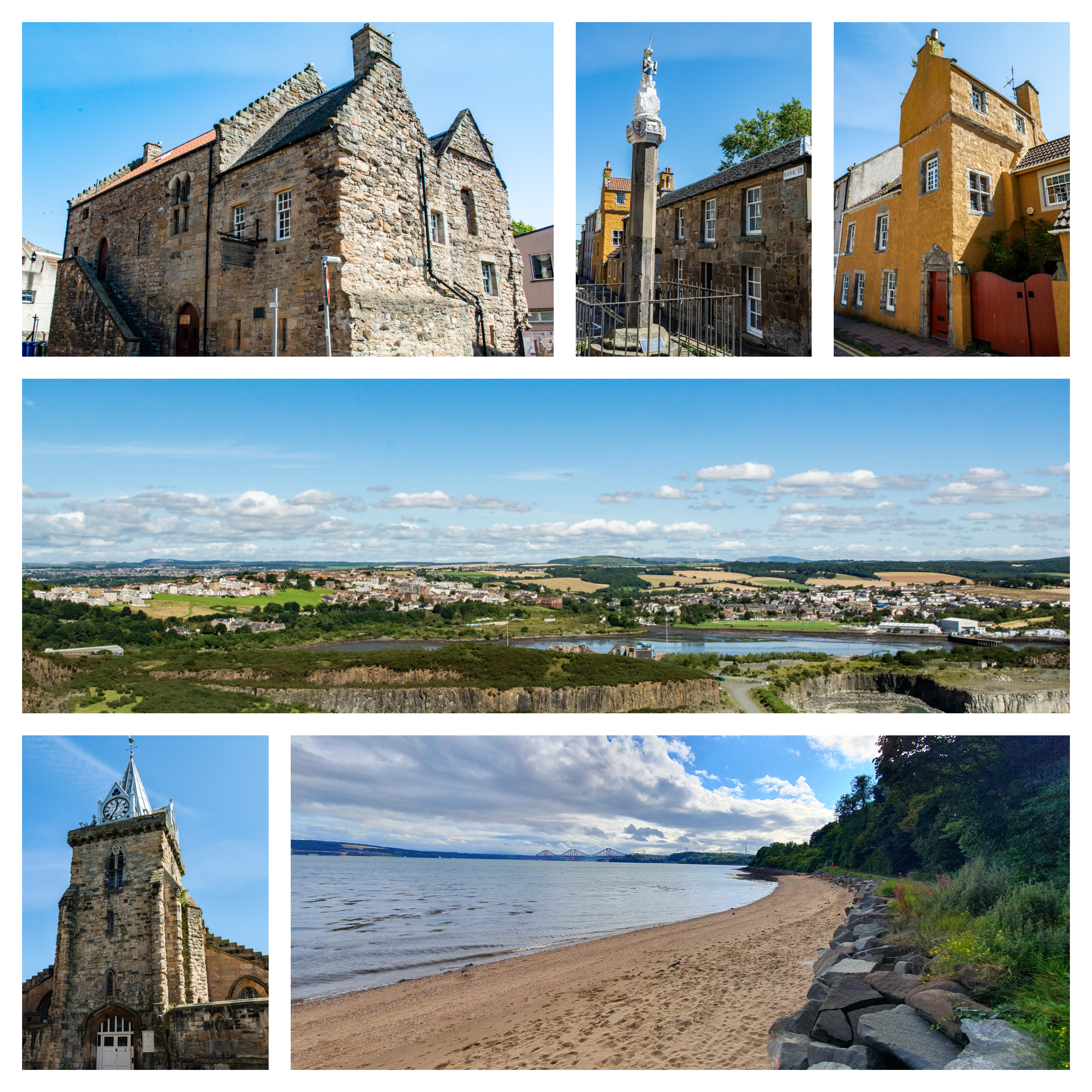
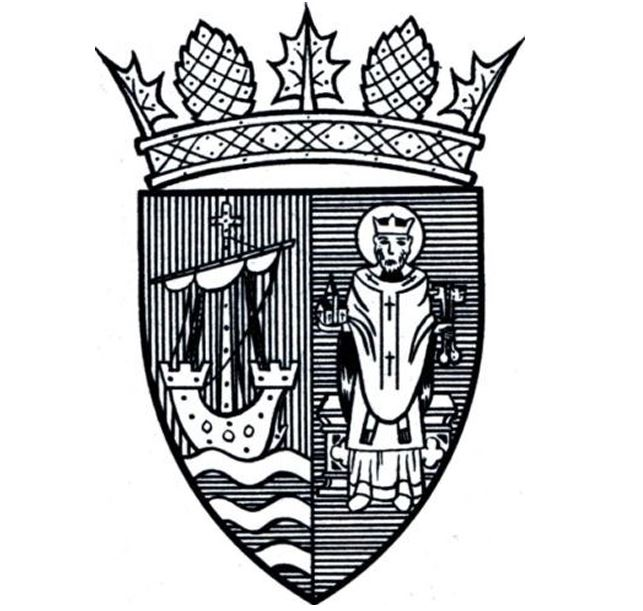
- From top left: Friary, Mercat Cross, Thomson's House, view of town, St. Peter's Church, beach on coastal path. Burgh Arms of Inverkeithing

- Location near the City of Edinburgh council area Location within Fife
- Population: 5,260 (2020)
- Burgh Charter: pre-1159 AD
- OS grid reference: NT130829
  - Edinburgh: 9 1/2 mi (15.5 km) S
  - London: 340 mi (547 km) S
- Council area: Fife
- Lieutenancy area: Fife
- Country: Scotland
- Sovereign state: United Kingdom
- Post town: Inverkeithing
- Postcode district: KY11
- Dialling code: 01383
- Police: Scotland
- Fire: Scottish
- Ambulance: Scottish
- UK Parliament: Dunfermline and West Fife
- Scottish Parliament: Cowdenbeath

Inverkeithing (/ɪnvərˈkiːðɪŋ/; Scottish Gaelic: Inbhir Chèitinn) is a coastal town, parish and historic Royal burgh in Fife, Scotland. The town lies on the north shore of the Firth of Forth, 9 1/2 mi (15.5 km) northwest of Edinburgh city centre and 3 1/2 mi (5.5 km) south of Dunfermline.

Inverkeithing became an important centre of trade during the Middle Ages and was granted Royal burgh status by 1159. It was the meeting place of the Parliament of Scotland in 1354 and the Convention of Royal Burghs from 1487 to 1552. The Battle of Inverkeithing in 1651 was a pivotal engagement in the Wars of the Three Kingdoms. Following the Industrial Revolution, Inverkeithing developed industries including quarrying, ship breaking and paper milling.

Inverkeithing town centre is a conservation area that retains a medieval town plan, with a well-preserved medieval friary and a notable example of a mercat cross. The town's annual highland games and Lammas fair are among the oldest in Scotland. Inverkeithing lies on the Fife Coastal Path, one of Scotland's Great Trails, and the Fife Pilgrim Way.

Inverkeithing railway station is a main stop for trains running over the nearby Forth Bridge, and the town is home to the Ferrytoll Park & Ride. A significant share of Inverkeithing's workers commute to Edinburgh city centre or Dunfermline for work. The town has a population of 5,260 (2022) and the civil parish has a population of 8,878 (2022).

== Toponymy ==
The name is of Scottish Gaelic origin, Inbhir Céitein. Inbhir is a common element in place names with Celtic roots and means "confluence, inflow" (see Aber and Inver), thus "mouth of the Keithing/Céitein". The Keithing burn is the name of a small river that runs through the southern part of the town. Simon Taylor notes that the name Keithing probably contains the Pictish (Brythonic) *coet, "wood", so "Keithing burn" would therefore mean "stream that runs through or past or issues from woodland". William Watson in 1910 hypothesised an etymological link between the hydronym Keithing and the Welsh cethin, "dusky" (cf. Bryncethin).

== Geography ==
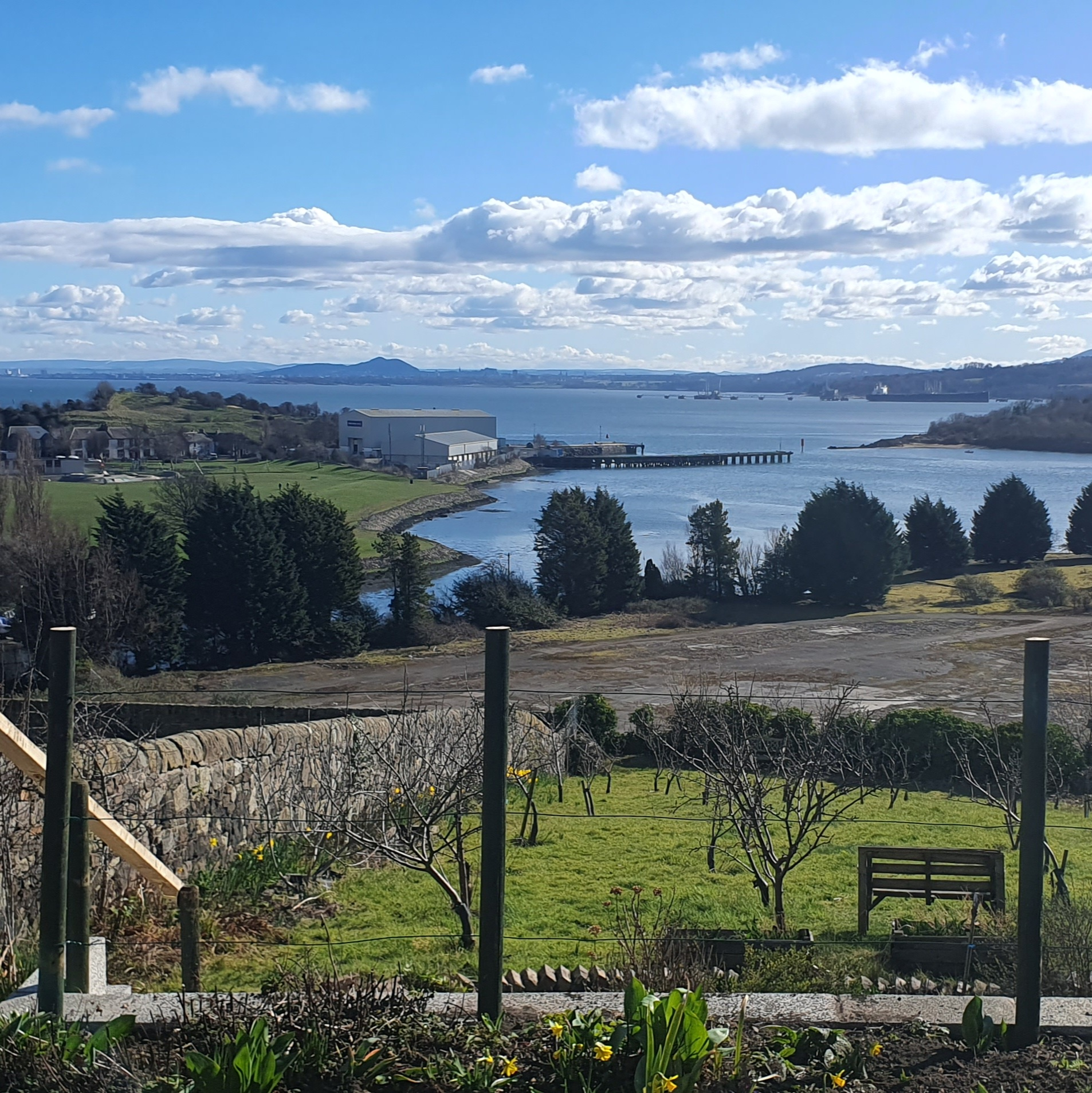
Inverkeithing Bay as viewed from the Friary Gardens.

Inverkeithing lies on the north shore of the Firth of Forth at its narrowest crossing point. Inverkeithing is almost contiguous with the neighbouring settlements of North Queensferry, Jamestown, Rosyth, Hillend village and Dalgety Bay. The nearest cities are Dunfermline, 3.5 mi (6 km) northwest, and Edinburgh, 9.5 miles (15 km) southeast.

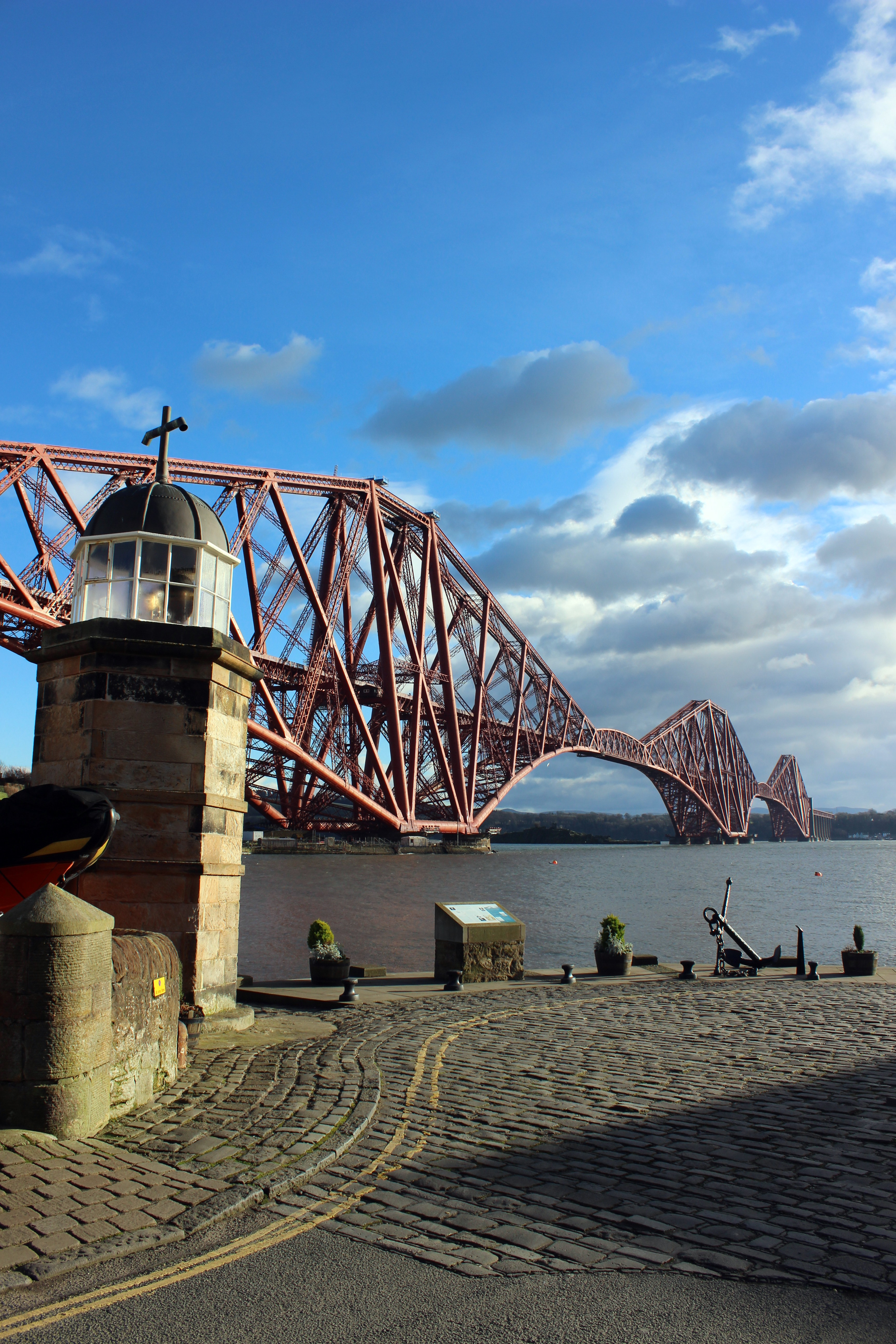
The Forth Bridge, linking Inverkeithing to the City of Edinburgh by rail.

Topographically, Inverkeithing is situated on a raised terrace sloping down towards Inverkeithing Bay, which cuts into the south of the town, separating it from the North Queensferry Peninsula. The town is bounded to the west by Castlandhill and to the east by Letham Hill, a 324 ft coastal hill and woodland.

The Keithing Burn is a small river that flows through Inverkeithing. The river falls into the Inner Bay of Inverkeithing Bay 1/4 mi (400 m) south of the town centre at Inverkeithing Harbour.

Inverkeithing lies on the Fife Coastal Path, a long-distance footpath designated as one of Scotland's Great Trails. Coming from North Queensferry, the path winds around the Inner Bay, through Inverkeithing town, by Ballast Bank park, and past a small sandy beach. The Fife Pilgrim Way also passes through Inverkeithing.

Fairykirk is a woodland and shrubland in Inverkeithing, part of the Ferryhills nature protected area.

== History ==
=== Early history ===
Neolithic finds from Inverkeithing include stone axe heads, which suggests people were clearing woodland in Inverkeithing during the fourth millennium BC. The discovery of a collared urn indicates burial activity in the second millennium BC.

There is evidence that during the Roman conquest of Britain, Roman governor Agricola established an encampment in the area between AD 78–87 during his war against the Caledonians, and that Roman Road is of Roman origin. Archaeological finds in Inverkeithing include a bronze Roman coin dating from AD 218–222 and a roman urn.

According to legend, in the 5th century St Erat, a follower of St Ninian, is said to have founded a church in Inverkeithing.

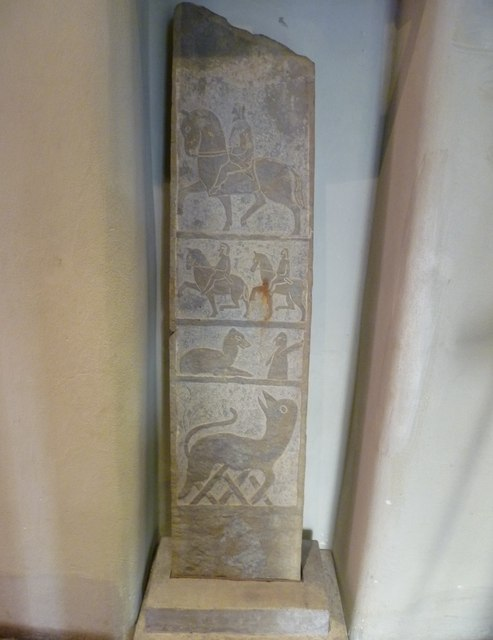
The Inverkeithing Stone, a Pictish monument dating probably to the 8th or 9th century.

The Inverkeithing stone, a Pictish standing stone depicting a hunt and a mythical beast, indicates a Pictish presence in Inverkeithing around the 8th or 9th century.

=== Medieval Inverkeithing (12th to 16th centuries) ===
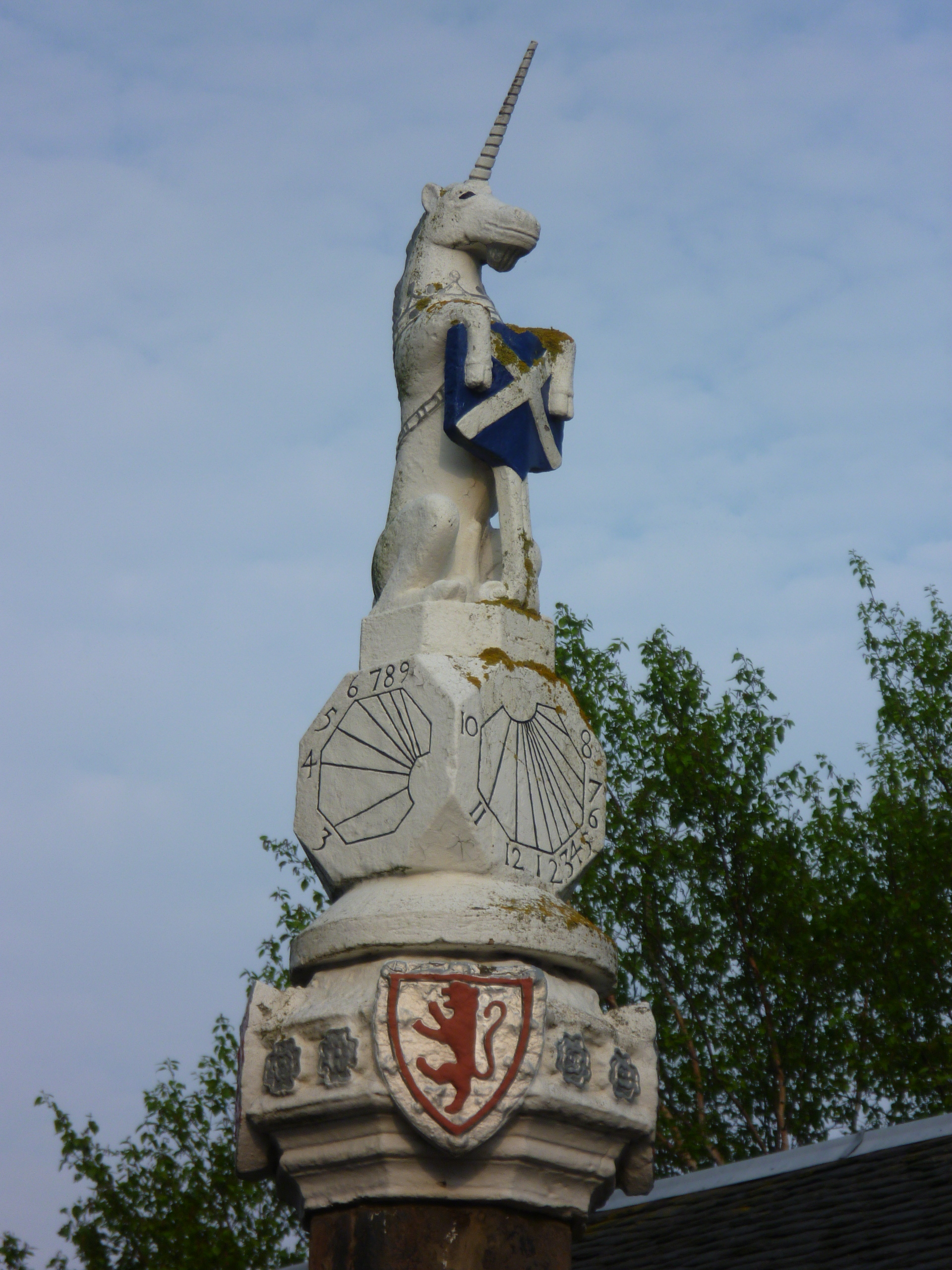
Unicorn finial on Inverkeithing Mercat Cross, symbolising the town's status as a royal burgh.

Inverkeithing is first documented in 1114, when it is mentioned in the foundation charter of Scone Abbey granted by Alexander I. Inverkeithing is mentioned as an existing burgh Royal burgh in 1159, making it among the oldest in Fife. This brought legal and trading privileges. The settlement was an obvious choice to be created a burgh, as its location at the narrowest crossing point of the Firth of Forth and its sheltered bay were both strategically important.

Throughout much of the Middle Ages, Inverkeithing was an important staging post for pilgrims. Travellers on their way to the shrines of Saint Margaret and Saint Andrew would stop in the town after crossing the Firth of Forth; a charter of Pope Alexander in 1163 refers to "the passage of Inverkeithin", suggesting the north end of the Queensferry Passage was once located in Inverkeithing. A hostel for pilgrims in Inverkeithing is documented as a possession of Dryburgh Abbey in 1196. A Franciscan friary, Inverkeithing Friary, was established in the 14th century.

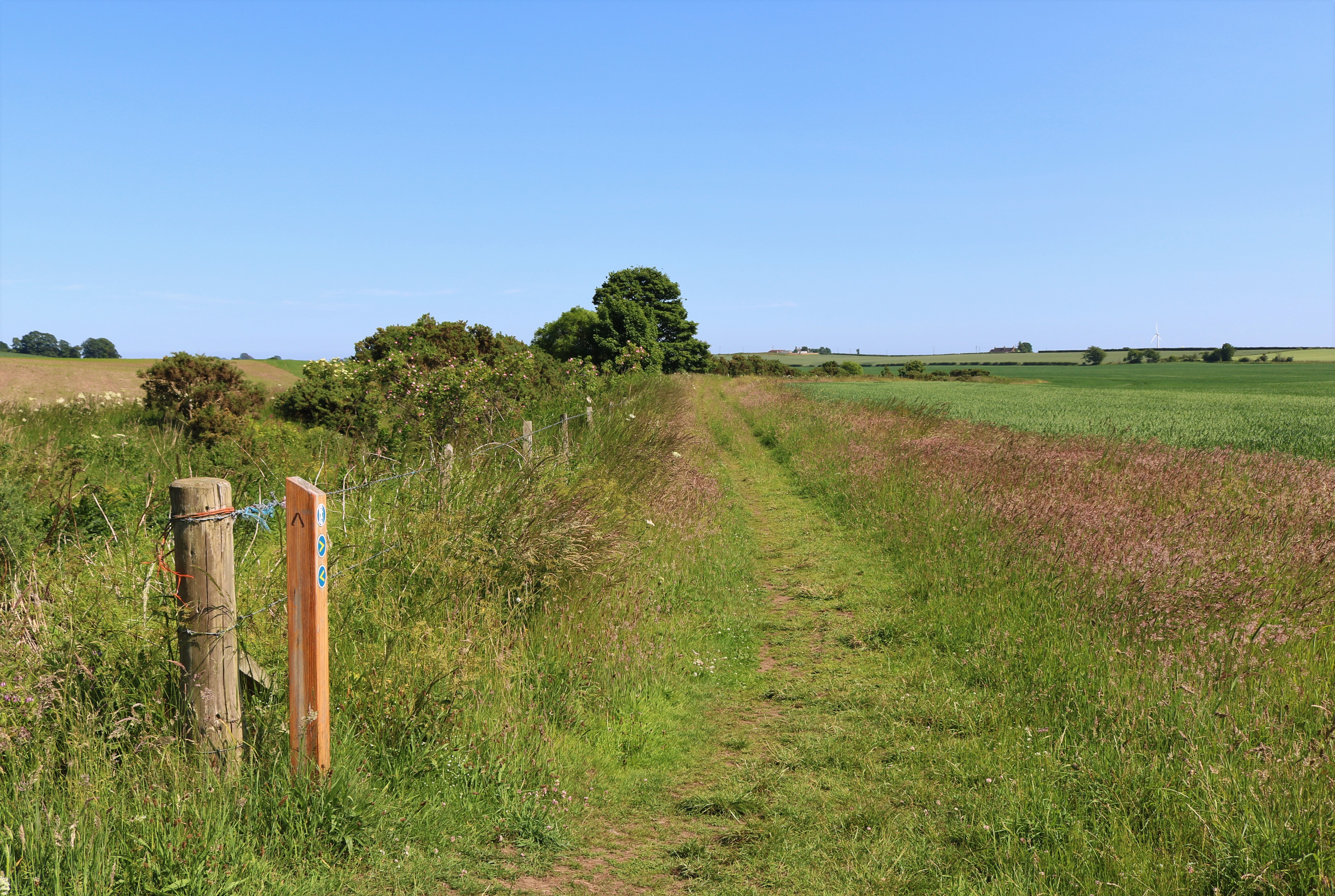
The medieval pilgrimage route through Inverkeithing is commemorated on the Fife Pilgrim Way.

Inverkeithing's medieval church was first built by Waltheof of Allerdale, who gifted it to Dunfermline Abbey in 1139. The parish church was later completed in stone and consecrated to St Peter by Bishop David de Bernham on 24 August 1244. The church hosted the decisive hearing of the Scottish Catholic-Culdee dispute in 1250, which strengthened Roman Catholic authority in Scotland.

Inverkeithing was the last place Alexander III visited before his death on 19 March 1286. After crossing the Firth of Forth on his way to visit Queen Yolande at Kinghorn, he ignored advice to remain in Inverkeithing overnight and continued his journey in poor weather. He was found dead near Kinghorn the following day, having apparently fallen from his horse.

Inverkeithing as shown in Timothy Pont's map of Scotland, c. 1583-1613.

At the advent of the First War of Scottish Independence, in August 1296, 13 burgesses of Inverkeithing swore fealty to Edward I of England. Edward I stayed in the town on 2 March 1304. In autumn 1316, Robert the Bruce issued royal charters from Inverkeithing, showing full Scottish administration had returned. In 1320, Bruce had Roger de Mowbray, baron of Inverkeithing, posthumously beheaded for treason due to his support for the Bailiol claim to the throne during the war, causing the town to be forfeited to the Crown.

In 1363, during the Rebellion of the Three Earls, Inverkeithing was drawn into the conflict when the town's royal properties were attacked at night by the rebels under Robert the Steward.

Inverkeithing played a role in Scottish royal affairs during the Middle Ages. In April 1354 the Parliament of Scotland met at Inverkeithing and discussed the terms of David II's return from captivity following the Battle of Neville's Cross. Similarly, in 1423 Inverkeithing was where the Duke of Albany arranged for James I's return from captivity in England. The town was a frequent residence of David I and a favourite residence of Annabella Drummond, Queen of Scotland from 1390 to 1401.

In 1487, an Act of Parliament during the reign of James III specified that the Convention of Royal Burghs would be held annually in Inverkeithing. Evolving in parallel to the Parliament of Scotland, the Convention was an important representative assembly of trading towns. It is unclear how many meetings were held at Inverkeithing before the Convention moved to Edinburgh in 1552.

Inverkeithing was granted a charter for holding Saint Luke's fair in the 14th century by Robert II. Inverkeithing Lammas fair is first recorded in 1503, and Inverkeithing's Highland Games are first recorded in 1646.

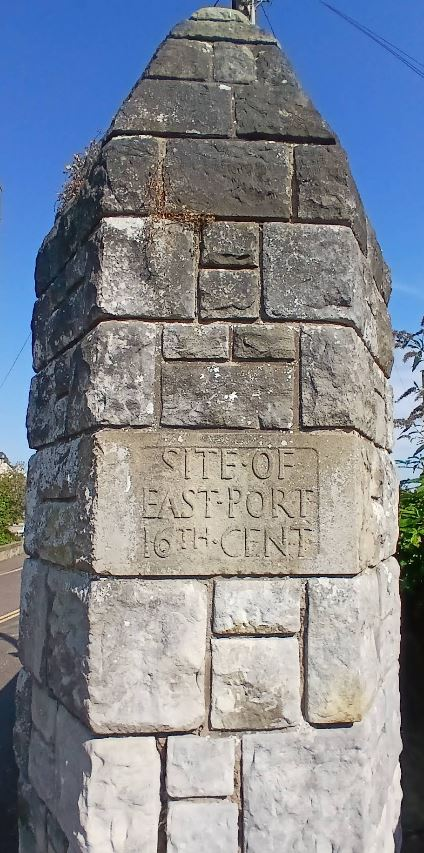
The East Port of Inverkeithing town wall

In the 16th century, Inverkeithing traded in wool, fleece and hides, and served as a hub of commerce for Fife with weekly markets. From the Middle Ages, Inverkeithing's ships traded with ports in the Baltics, Germany and the Low Countries.

Inverkeithing was one of the few Scottish burghs to have four stone gates, known as "ports". Inverkeithing town walls were built in 1557.

=== Early modern Inverkeithing (17th to mid-18th centuries) ===
The Inverkeithing witch hunt took place between 1621 and 1655, during which at least 51 people were executed for witchcraft in the town. The executions were carried out at Witch Knowe to the south of town. Walter Bruce, minister of Inverkeithing from 1641 to 1673, played a pivotal role in initiating the Great Scottish witch hunt of 1649–50.

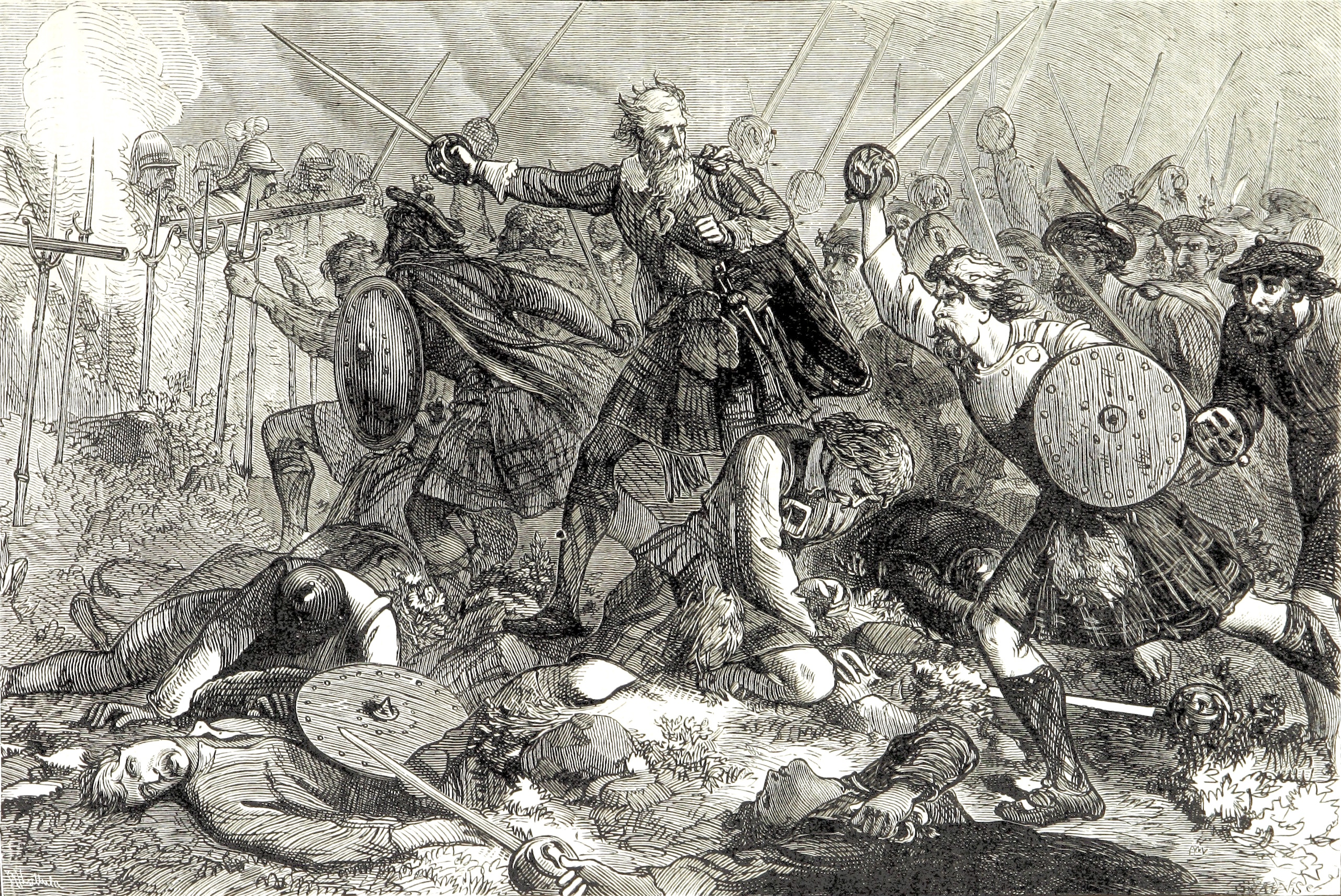
The charge of Sir Hector Maclean's forces at the Battle of Inverkeithing, depicted in British Battles on Land and Sea (1873)

The Battle of Inverkeithing, fought on 20 July 1651, was the last major engagement of the Wars of the Three Kingdoms before the Kingdom of Scotland passed into Oliver Cromwell's control. It was an attempt by the English Parliamentarian forces to outflank the army of Scottish Covenanters loyal to Charles II at Stirling and get access to the north of Scotland. Cromwell's 4,500 troops defeated a Scottish force of roughly equal size. Of the estimated 800 MacLean clansmen who fought in the battle, 35 were said to have survived. General George Monck of the Parliamentary army occupied Inverkeithing following the battle, and permitted his soldiers to plunder the town; many houses were burned down.

Trade declined during the 17th and 18th century amid plague and war. In 1654, Joan Blaeu mentions Inverkeithing as "formerly a flourishing market". In 1710, Robert Sibbald wrote Inverkeithing "hath been a place of good resort". In 1724 Daniel Defoe found the town to be "still populous, but decayed, as to what it has formerly been", sentiments echoed by Sir William Burrell in 1758.

On 20 October 1706, Inverkeithing town council unanimously petitioned Parliament against the proposed Treaty of Union, however its representative, James Spittle, subsequently voted to ratify the treaty. Following Union in 1707, Inverkeithing lost its separate Parliament of Scotland constituency and became part of the Stirling Burghs constituency in the Parliament of the United Kingdom. Electoral malpractice in 18th century Inverkeithing was notable during the 1760 Inverkeithing Provostship election and the 1796 Stirling Burghs election.

Inverkeithing attracted national attention in 1707 with the Murder of Henry Stenhouse, a crime of passion in which Robert Balfour, Lord of Burleigh, murdered a local schoolmaster in the town.

The Inverkeithing Case of 1752 originated from a dispute between the congregation of Inverkeithing Parish Church against the choosing of a minister by right of patronage, and turned into a national public controversy that led to the Second Secession of the Church of Scotland with the founding of the Relief Church, and locally of St John's Church.

=== Industrial Inverkeithing (mid 18th to 19th centuries) ===
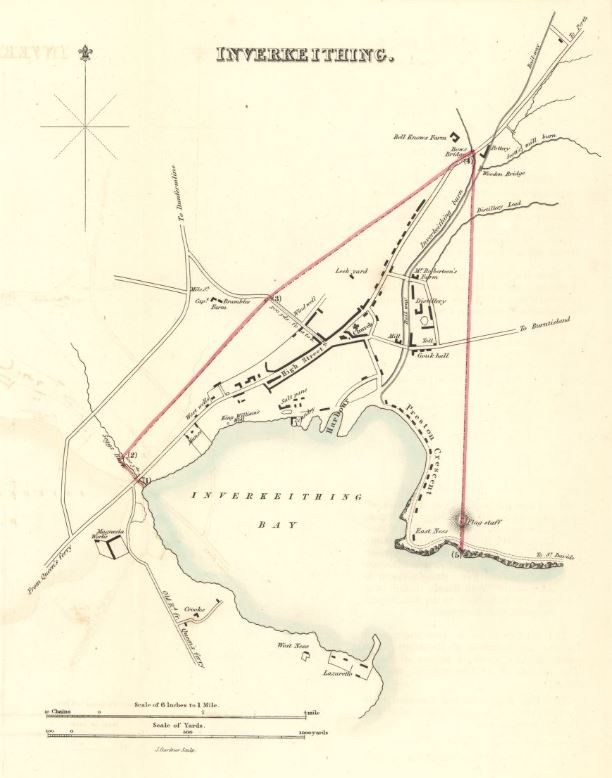
1832 map of Inverkeithing.

Inverkeithing developed many industries during the Industrial Revolution. In the 18th century, lead and coal were mined, there was an iron foundry, a brewery, tan works, soap works, a salt pan and timber works. A whisky distillery was opened in 1795; its buildings were later used for oil works. The Halbeath Waggon Railway transported coal from Halbeath Colliery to Inverkeithing harbour from 1783 until 1867. A sign of industrial employment, in 1785 the town council employed a town piper to mark the beginning and end of the working day.

The population of Inverkeithing, 1700—1951
Year	1700	1755	1801	1811	1821	1831	1861	1871	1881	1891	1901	1951
Population	1,630	1,684	2,228	2,400	2,512	3,189	3,124	3,074	2,540	2,591	3,465	5,139

Significant building took place in the early 19th century, including Inverkeithing Corn Exchange in 1833, a residential crescent for retired sea captains by Sir Robert Preston, and the town's three bridges over the Keithing Burn—Boreland Road Bridge, King Street Bridge and Commercial Road Bridge—in 1829, 1815 and 1821, respectively.

Maritime trade remained buoyant. From 1810 to 1835, Inverkeithing Lazaretto operated for sailor quarantine on land, one of only two in Scotland. In 1845, Inverkeithing registered 25 vessels of its own.

Queen Victoria and Prince Albert visited Inverkeithing on 6 September 1842, where they were received by an audience of 15,000.

Inverkeithing by P. Young (1870).

In the mid-19th century, major industries in the area were engineering, shipbuilding and quarrying. Quarrying provided material for important works such as the extension of Leith pier and the Forth Bridge. Brickworks operated from 1831 to 1895.

By the 1870s, engineering and shipbuilding had declined, and the harbour lost freight traffic to the railways. Inverkeithing Railway Station opened in 1877, and was expanded in 1890 following the completion of the Forth Bridge and the Jamestown Viaduct.

=== Modern Inverkeithing (20th century onwards) ===
In the 20th century, Inverkeithing became known for new industries. Caldwell's paper mill operated from 1914—2003. Quarrying remained a major operation at Cruicks quarry and Prestonhill quarry until the 1980s. Inverkeithing built one of the first cinemas in Scotland in 1914.

1941 naval procession through Inverkeithing for Warship Week.

Shipbreaking at Thos. W. Ward's Inverkeithing (Jamestown) yard saw notable ships including HMS Dreadnought (1923), the hull of the Titanic's sister ship RMS Olympic (1937), the Nazi Party cruise ship Robert Ley (1947) and RMS Mauretania (1966).

Inverkeithing lost 130 people in WWI and 36 in WWII. In July 1939, Inverkeithing was declared a danger area because of its close proximity to Rosyth dockyard; at intervals during the war, children were evacuated to central Fife. During the Battle of the River Forth, the first air raid over Britain of WWII, pilots of the 602 (Glasgow) squadron spotted Luftwaffe aircraft over Inverkeithing. They were ordered to pursue the aircraft through broken cloud, and two German aircrew were killed. Inverkeithing was bombed on 7 April 1941 by the Luftwaffe, in an attempt to disrupt supply and communication lines along the Forth. The Polish government in exile operated a barracks in Inverkeithing during WWII.

Inverkeithing recovered quickly from WWII; the town is recorded as having 88 shops in 1951, and benefitted from the opening of the Forth Road Bridge in 1964. Inverkeithing's population grew with post-war immigration; Smith (1952) describes "[Inverkeithing's locals] live side by side with paper makers from Aberdeen, ship breakers of Irish ancestry, quarry workers from the Highlands and Borders, and from most parts of Scotland, with a fair admixture of English". In 1975, all Royal Burghs were disbanded and Inverkeithing came within Fife Council. Inverkeithing conservation area was created in 1985 to preserve the heritage of the town.

In 2019, the then Prime Minister Boris Johnson launched the 2019 Scottish Conservative General Election manifesto in Inverkeithing.

== Places of interest ==
Inverkeithing is home to 55 listed buildings, including five of category A status. The heart of the medieval town was located around High Street, Bank Street, Townhall Street and Church Street, which now forms Inverkeithing conservation area.

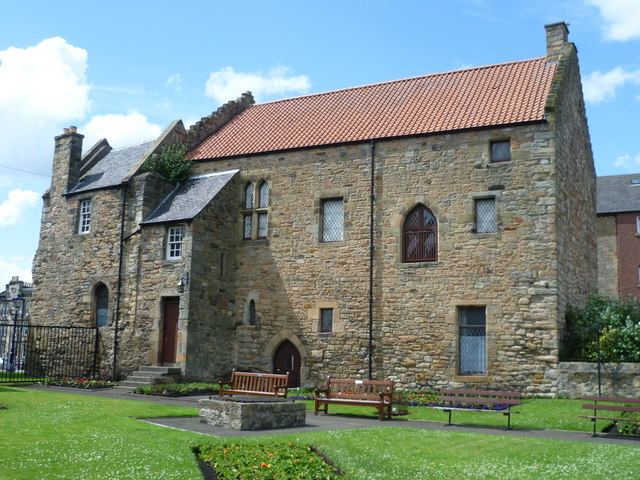
Inverkeithing Friary and gardens is a Franciscan friary first mentioned in 1384, considered to be the best preserved in Scotland.

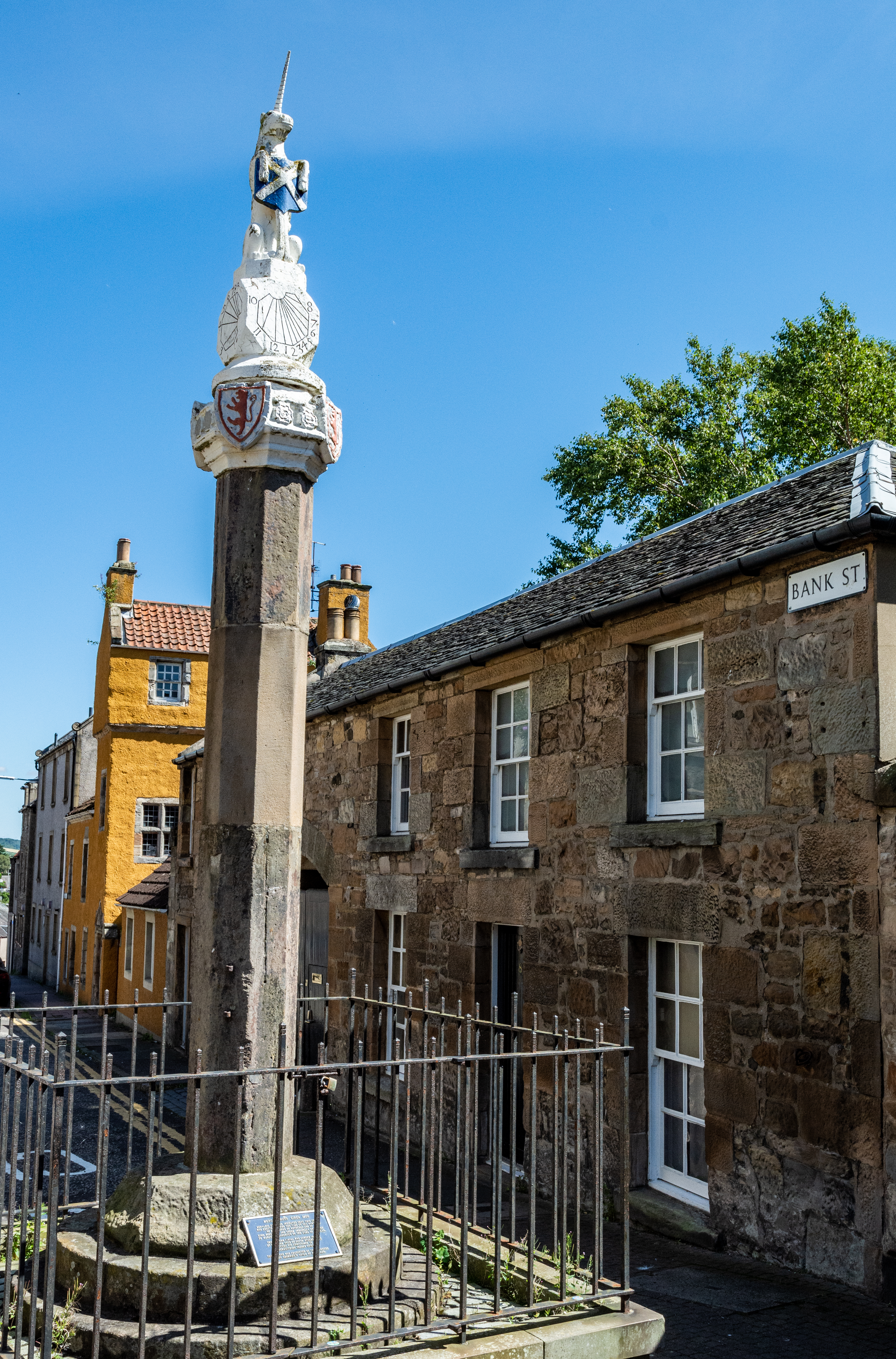
Inverkeithing Mercat Cross dates from 1389, and is believed to have been built as a memorial of the marriage between the Duke of Rothsay and the daughter of the Earl of Douglas.

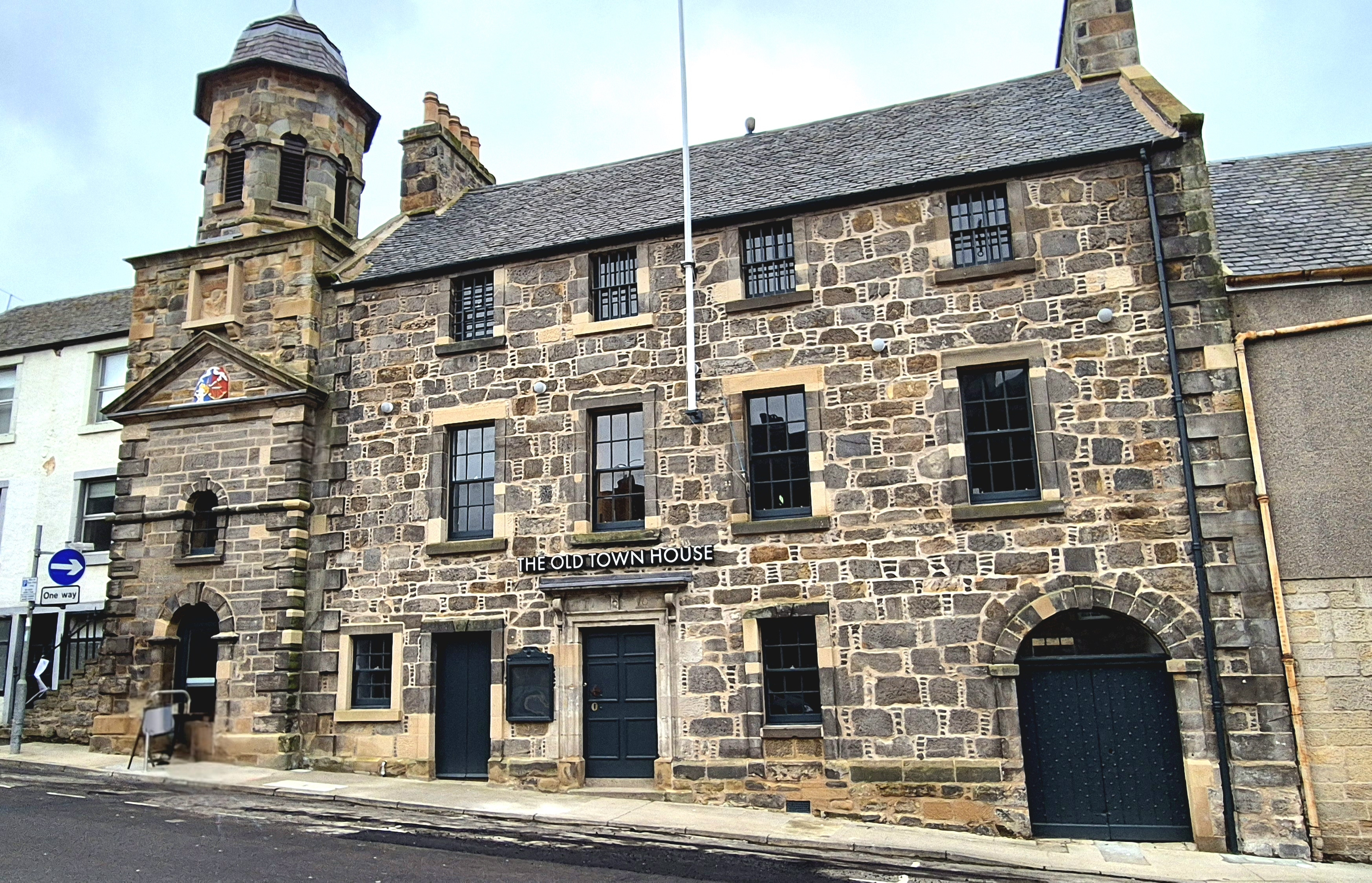
Inverkeithing Town House, also known as tolbooth, was a prison and court room, and now hosts Inverkeithing community council. The renaissance tower dates from 1755.

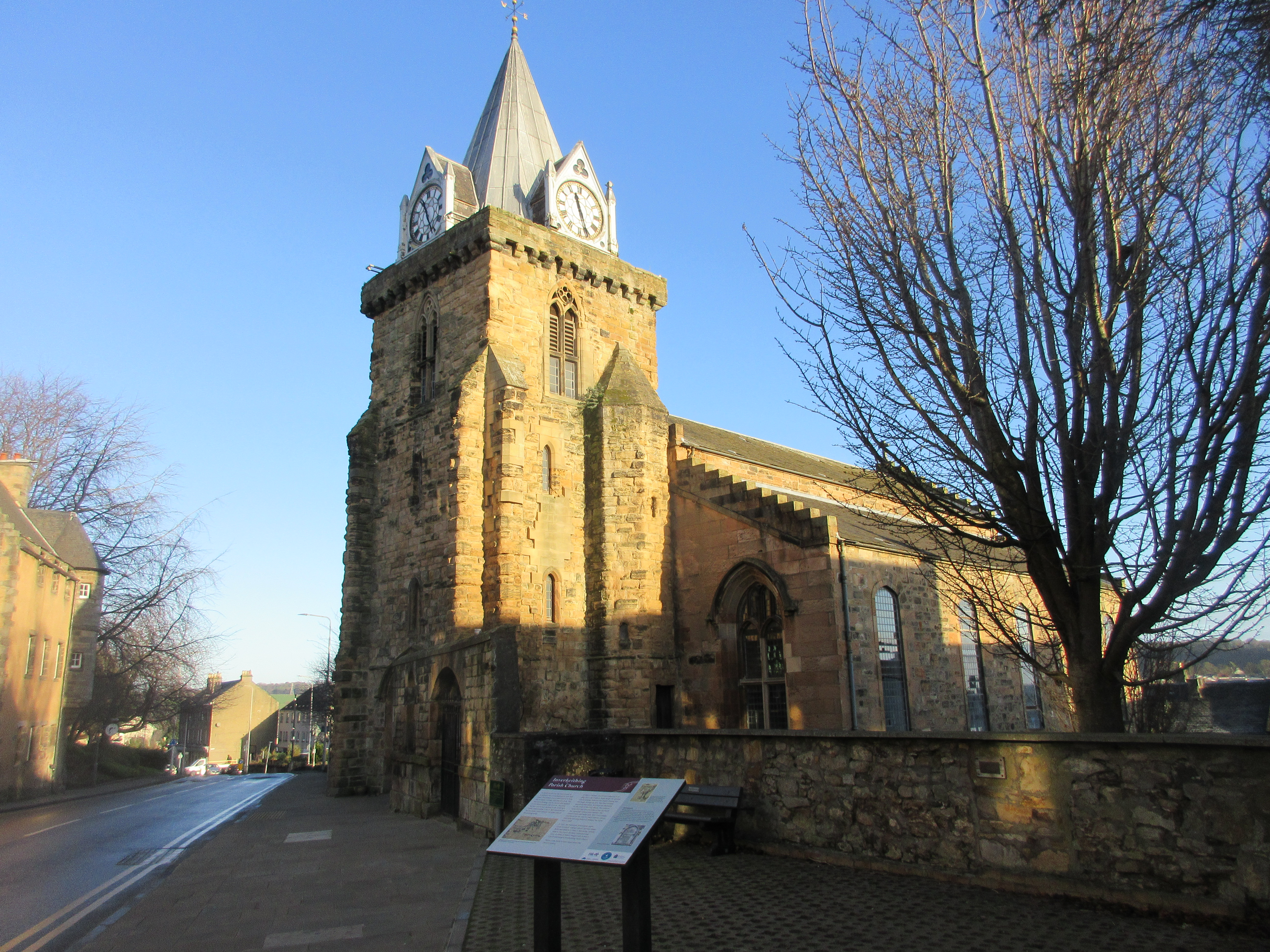
The gothic tower of Inverkeithing Parish Church dates to the 14th century, with the rest of the church rebuilt in 1827. Inside is a stone font gifted by Annabella Drummond in 1398.

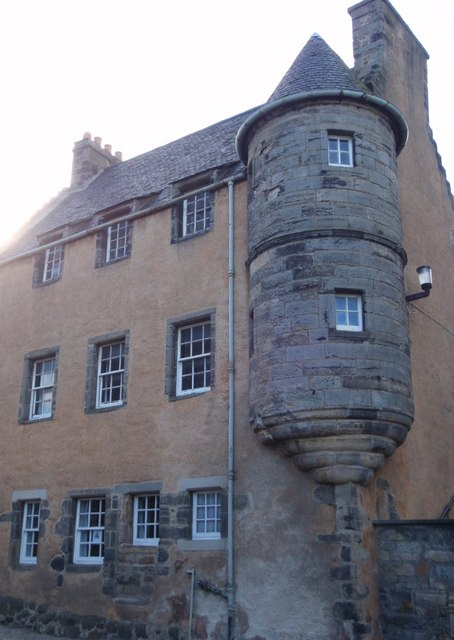
Fordell's Lodging is a baronial tower house built from 1666 to 1671 by Sir John Henderson of Fordell, whose family held the office of hereditary provost and sheriff of Inverkeithing by a grant of Mary Queen of Scots.

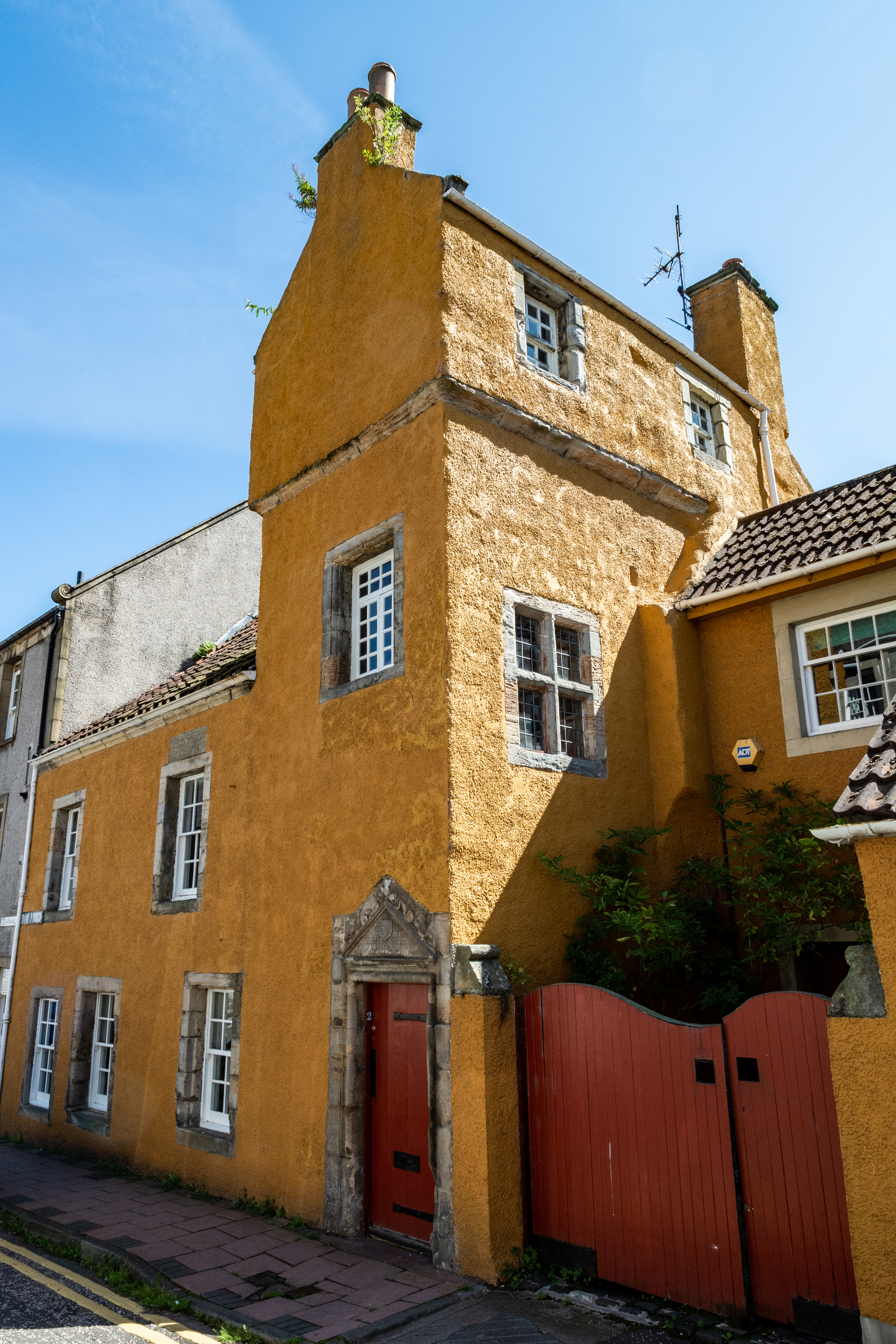
Thomson's House is an exceptionally preserved traditional burgh town house built in 1617, notable for its carved pediment dedicated to the first owners John Thomson ("I.T.") and Bessie Thomson ("B.T.").

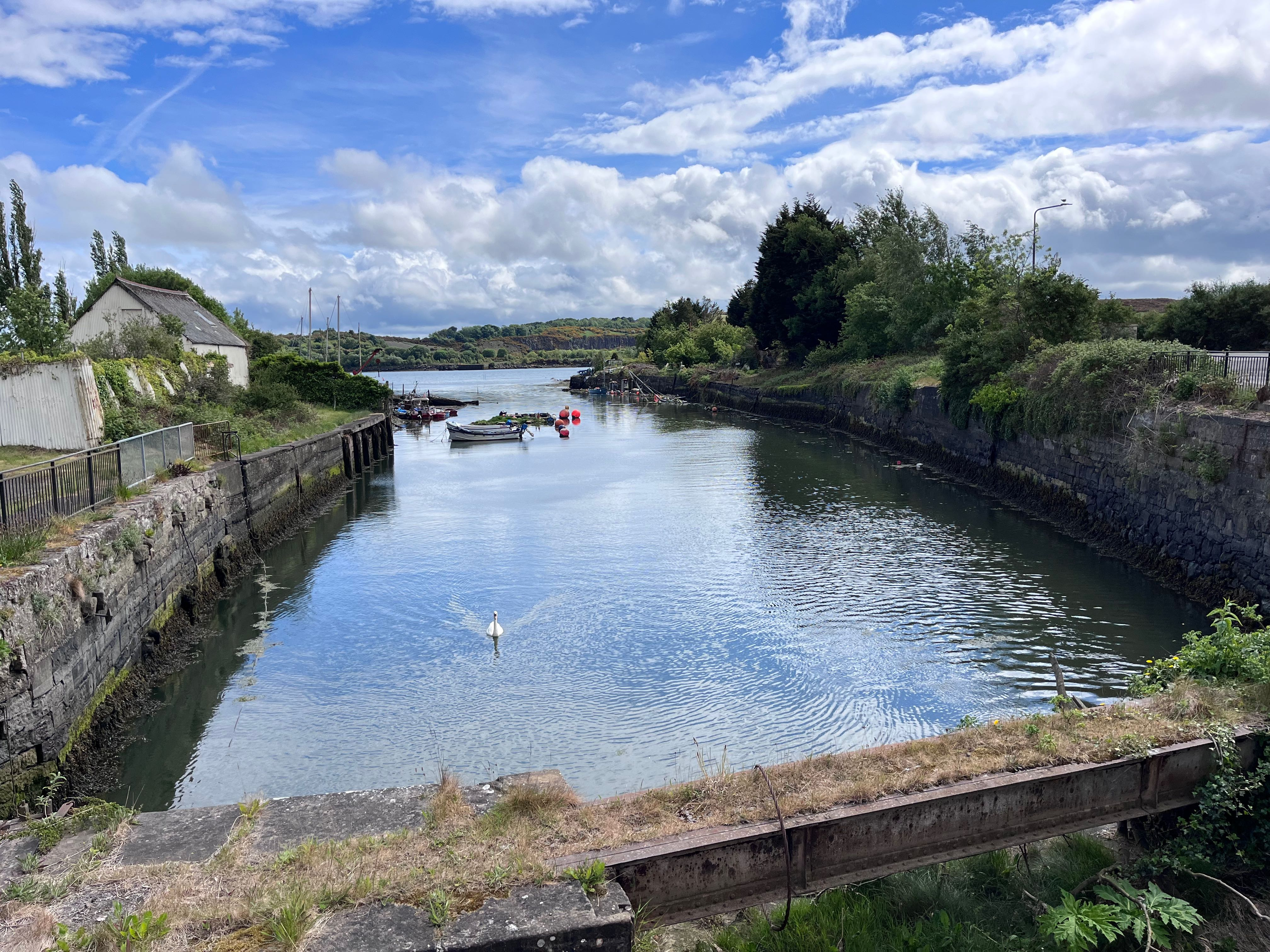
Inverkeithing Harbour was originally built before 1587, and the present harbour was constructed in the late 18th century.

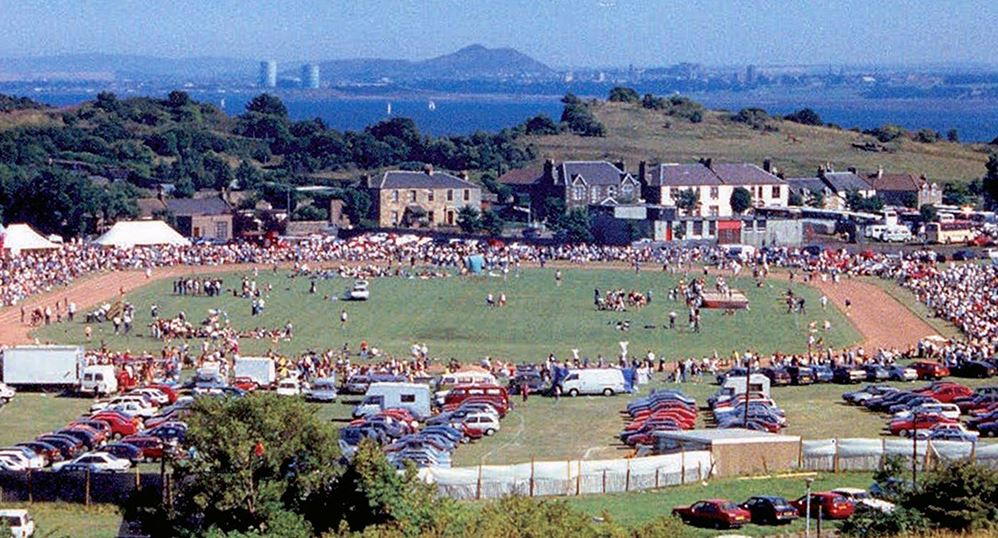
Ballast Bank Park is a large open green space on the banks of Inverkeithing Bay, and has hosted the Inverkeithing Highland Games since 1972.

=== Other places of interest ===
- Moffat Cottage
- Rosebery House
- The Burgh Arms
- The Half Crown
- Providence House
- Spencerfield House
- St John's Church
- Inverkeithing Corn Exchange
- Inverkeithing War Memorial
- Witchknowe Park
- Letham Hill
- Fairykirk

== Local community ==
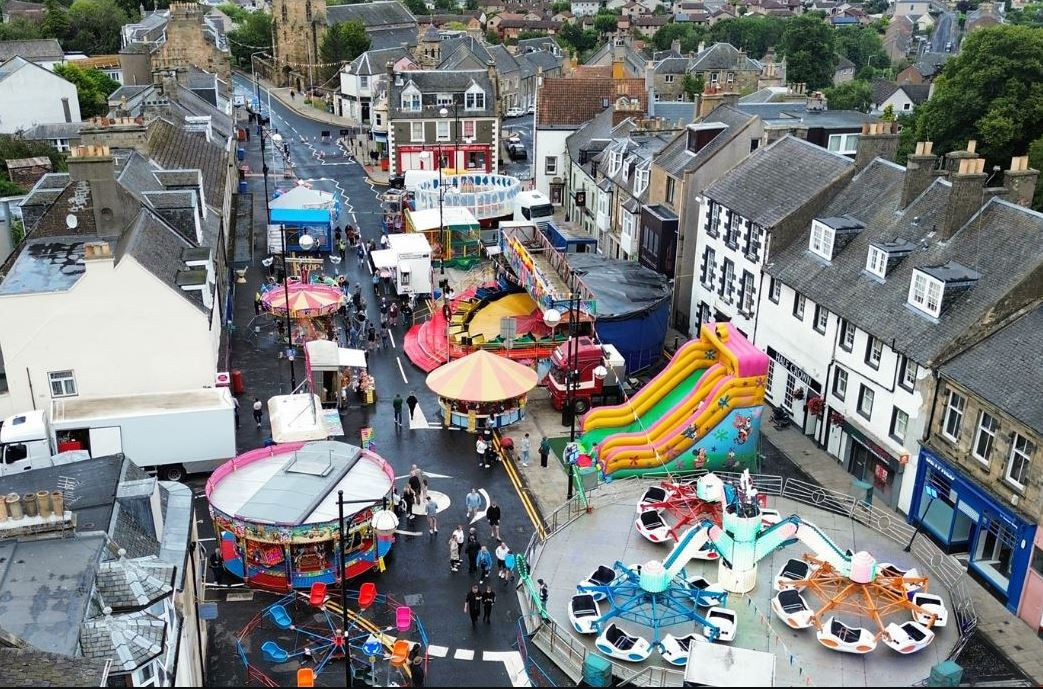
Inverkeithing Lammas Fair street rides (2025)

Notable local events include Inverkeithing Highland Games, Inverkeithing Lammas Fair and 'Divit Fest' summer music festival.

Inverkeithing Community Garden has been run by volunteers since 2010, and Fife Council runs Hope Street allotments and Spittalfield allotments.

The Inverkeithing Trust and Inverkeithing Community Council organise community life. Community venues in the town include Inverkeithing Civic Centre and library; Ballast Bank Community Centre; the 68th (Fife) Scouts group hall; and Lodge St John 60.

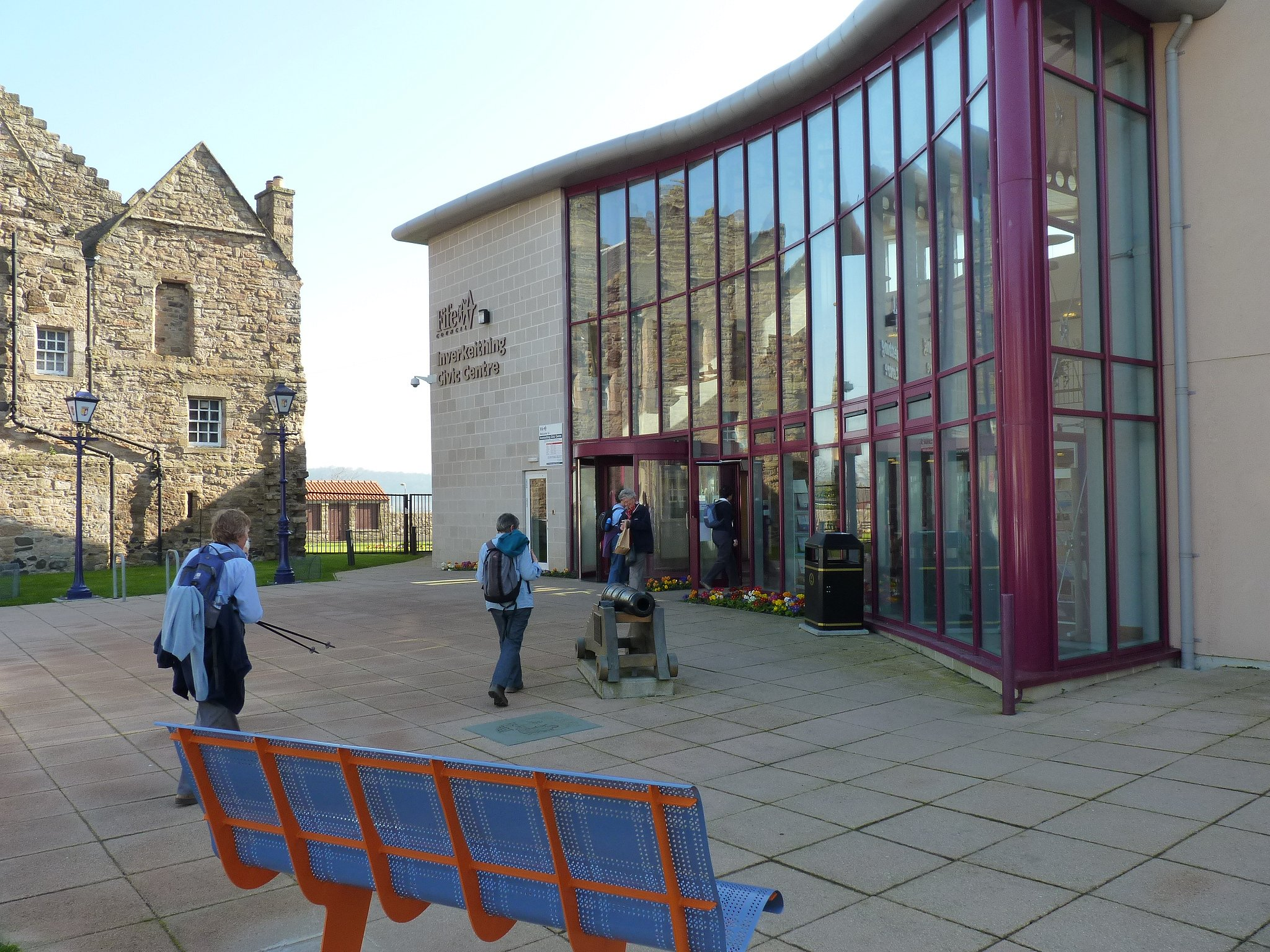
Inverkeithing Civic Centre, built in 1960 and modernised in 2011.

Inverkeithing has four active churches:

- Inverkeithing St Peters Parish Church (Church of Scotland)
- Saint Peter in Chains (Catholic Church)
- St Peters Church (Episcopal Church)
- Inverkeithing Baptist Church (Baptist Church)

Inverkeithing Primary School, Inverkeithing High School and Act Sing and Dance School (ASDS) are in the town, along with Inverkeithing Medical Group, an NHS practice.

== Sport ==
Inverkeithing United F.C. was founded in 1906, and won the Scottish Junior Cup in 1912–13. The team currently play as an SFA accredited community football club (2026).

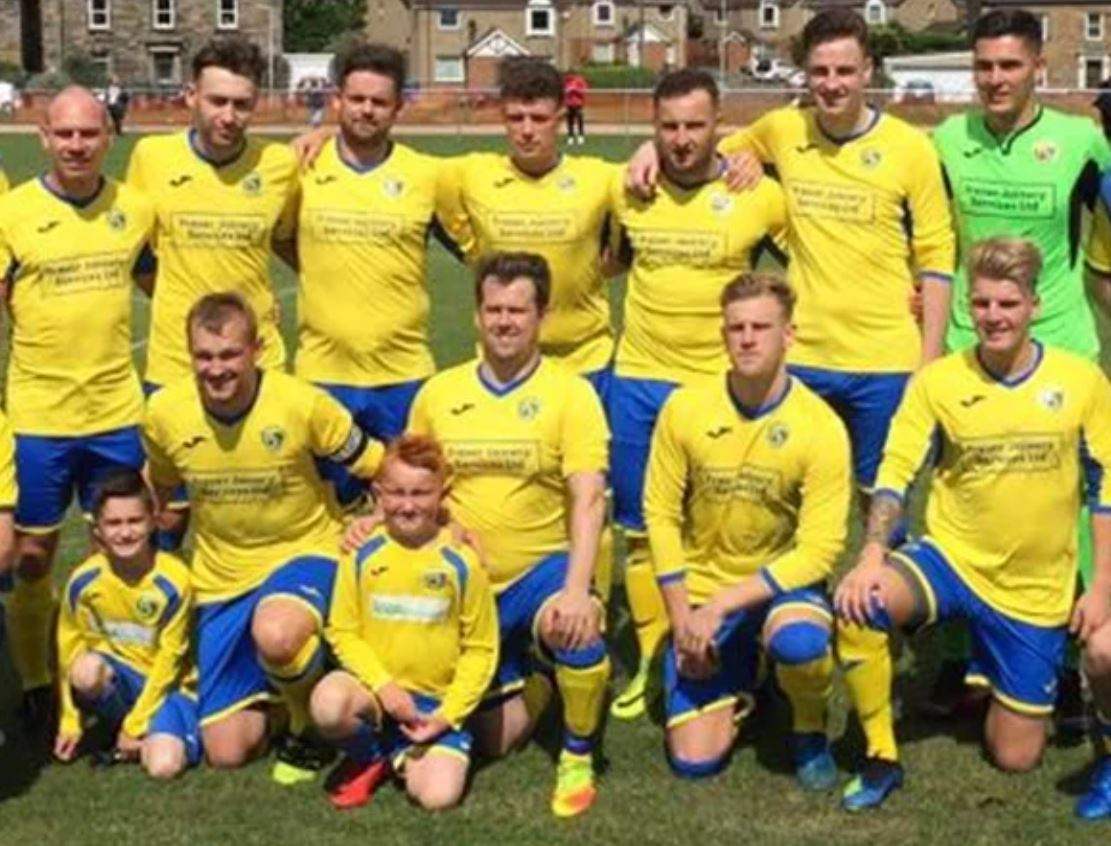
Inverkeithing Hillfield Swifts F.C. squad, 2018

Inverkeithing Hillfield Swifts, founded in 1996, compete in the East of Scotland League Second Division (2026).

Other notable sports clubs include Inverkeithing Bowling Club, founded in 1901; Inverkeithing Curling Club, founded 1838; and Inverkeithing Competitive Amateur Swimmers, founded in 1975.

== Governance ==
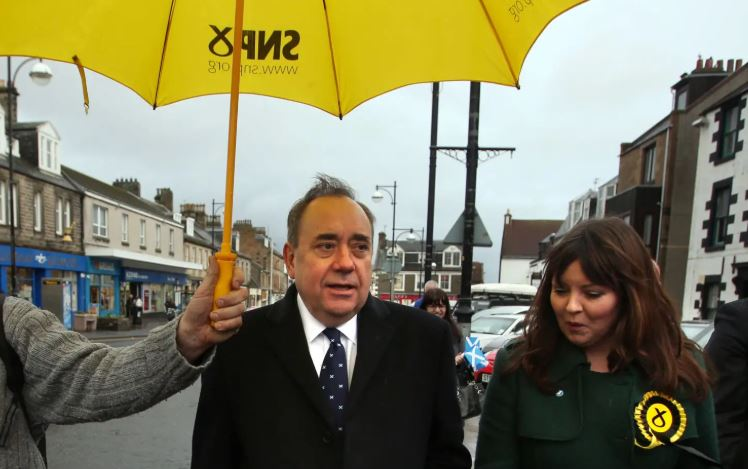
Alex Salmond campaigning in Inverkeithing with Natalie McGarry in 2014

For the UK Parliament, Inverkeithing is part of the Cowdenbeath and Kirkcaldy constituency, represented by Melanie Ward of the Labour Party since 2024.

For the Scottish Parliament, Inverkeithing is part of the Cowdenbeath constituency, represented by David Barratt of the Scottish National Party since 2026.

Fife Council is the local authority for Inverkeithing, which is part of the Inverkeithing and Dalgety Bay (ward). Following the 2022 local elections, councillors representing the town are David Barratt (SNP), Dave Dempsey (Conservative), Patrick Browne (Labour) and Sarah Neal (SNP).

Inverkeithing Community Council is the most local elected representation.

== Transport ==
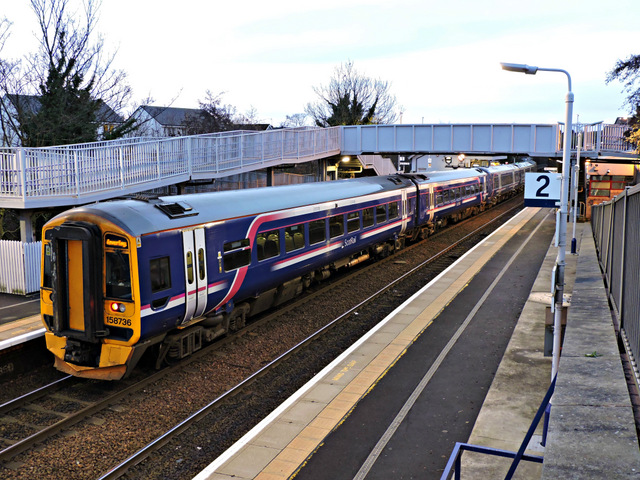
Inverkeithing railway station, 2025.

Inverkeithing Railway Station is a main stop for ScotRail's Fife Circle line services, as well as CrossCountry, LNER and Caledonian Sleeper services.

Bus services for Inverkeithing are operated by Stagecoach and Bay Travel. Ferrytoll Park and Ride is a bus park and ride scheme for Edinburgh and Fife located in Inverkeithing.

Inverkeithing is bypassed by the M90 motorway, which links Fife to Lothian and Edinburgh via the Queensferry Crossing.

Inverkeithing is on National Cycle Route 1 and National Cycle Route 76.

== In popular culture ==
- In 1971, rock band Nazareth began as a full-time band in Inverkeithing and first recorded Broken Down Angel in the town.
- The 2000 film Complicity, starring Jonny Lee Miller and Brian Cox, was partly filmed in Inverkeithing.
- In 2014, the Inverkeithing Highland Games were featured in season 7, episode 1 of the US television show Duck Dynasty, in which cast members participated in some of the events.
- In 2018, an episode of BBC's Celebrity Antiques Road Trip was set in Inverkeithing, featuring Fleming's Antique and Furniture Centre. In 2021, Antiques Road Trip filmed an episode in Inverkeithing.
- In 2024, scenes for the ITV crime series Karen Pirie was filmed on the High Street.

== Notable residents ==
This list contains notable people who were either born in, or residents of, Inverkeithing.

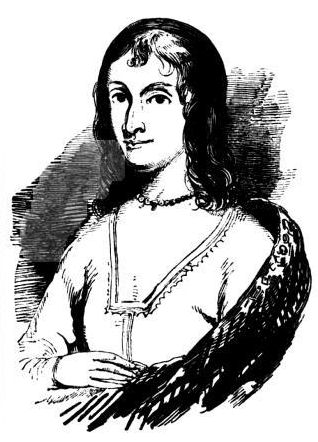
Anabella Drummond, Queen of Scotland

=== Royalty & religion ===
- Walter Bruce (1605–1673), longest serving leader of the Church of Scotland in history, from 1662 to 1673.
- Queen Annabella Drummond of Scotland (1350–1401).
- Saint Erat (c. 5th century), Christian missionary.
- Andrew Martin Fairbairn (1836-1912), religious scholar and founding Principal of Mansfield College, Oxford.
- Richard de Inverkeithing (d. 1272), Bishop of Dunkeld; Chamberlain of King Alexander II; and guardian to Alexander III.
- Robert Roche (1580–1640), leader of the Church of Scotland as Moderator of the Synod in 1613.

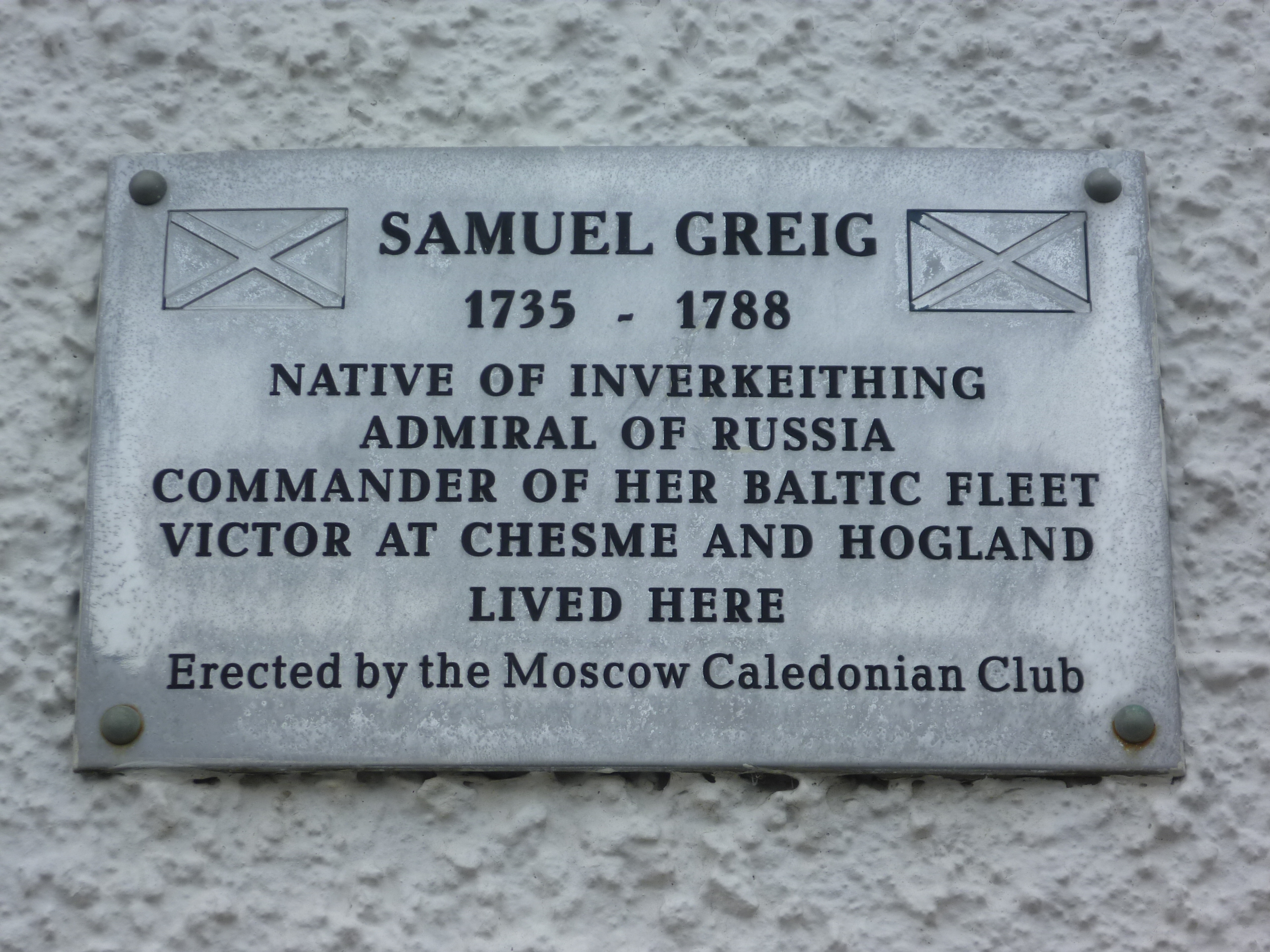
Samuel Grieg plaque, on the Half Crown

=== Military & politics ===
- Henry Echlin of Pittadro (d. 1606), negotiator during the 'lang siege' of Edinburgh Castle.
- Samuel Greig (1735–1788), 'Father of the Russian Navy'; military advisor to Catherine the Great.
- Sir John Henderson, 5th Baronet (1752-1817), MP for Fifeshire (1780), Dysart Burghs (1780–84), Seaford (1785-6), and Stirling Burghs (1806-7).
- Francis Holburne (1704–1771), Royal Navy Admiral; commander-in-chief at the Leeward Islands during the War of the Austrian Succession.
- Janet McCallum (1881–1946), Scottish trade unionist and suffragette.
- Natalie McGarry (1981–), MP for Glasgow East (2015 - 2017).
- David Spence (1818–1877), awarded the Victoria Cross for his actions during the Indian Rebellion of 1857.

Robert Moffat, missionary and the first person to translate the Bible into an African language.

=== Science & exploration ===
- John Yule Mackay (1860-1913), anatomist and Principal of the Universities of St Andrews and Dundee.
- Sir Duncan McDonald (1921–1997), engineer and industrialist.
- Robert Moffat (1795–1883), African missionary and the first to translate the Bible into an African language.
- John Smart Peddie (1816–1848), chief surgeon aboard HMS Terror during Franklin's lost expedition.
- Rev Alexander Stoddart Wilson (1854–1909), naturalist and founder of the Andersonian Naturalists Society.

=== Film, TV, literature & music ===
- Morris Blythman (1919–1981), poet, musician and political activist influential to the Scottish Folk Revival.
- Denise Coffey (1936–2022), English actress, comedian, director and playwright.
- Kenneth Roy (1945–2018), journalist, writer and broadcaster.
- James Simpson (1826–1882), author.

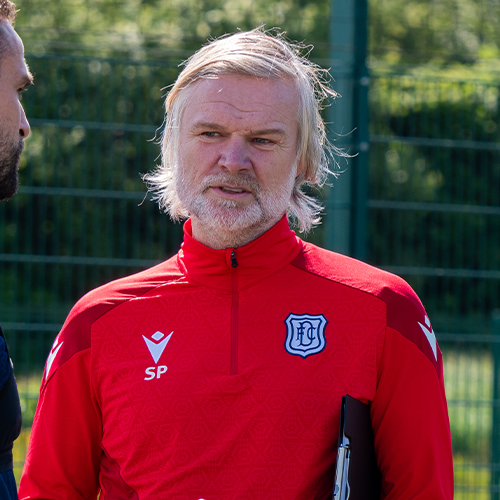
Steven Pressley, footballer for Scotland

=== Sport ===
- Barney Armit (1874–1899), All Blacks rugby union player.
- Finlay Davidson (2004–), Scottish Commonwealth Games and World Championship para powerlifter.
- Gordon Durie (1965–), footballer for Scotland, Chelsea F.C., Tottenham Hotspur F.C., Rangers F.C.
- Jock Gilfillan (1898–1976), footballer for Heart of Midlothian F.C. and Portsmouth F.C.
- Douglas Morgan (1890–1916), footballer for Hull City; World War I casualty.
- Steven Pressley (1973–), footballer for Scotland, Celtic, Rangers and Hearts; manager for Dundee.
- Alan Stewart (1955–), Winter Olympic skier for the 1976 and 1980 Winter Olympic Games.

=== Miscellaneous ===
- James Anderson, manager of Mount Vernon, George Washington's estate after his presidency.
- David Hutcheson (1799-1880), shipowner who opened up travel to the Western Isles of Scotland.
- James Scott (1767-1850), 'Superintendent of the Queensferry Passage' between 1810 and 1839.
- Henry Stenhouse (d. 1707), schoolmaster at Inverkeithing murdered by Robert Balfour in a famous crime of passion.

== See also ==
- Geography of Scotland in the Middle Ages
- List of places in Fife
- Inver place-name elements
