= St Peter's Episcopal Church, Inverkeithing =

Coordinates: 56°01′29″N 3°24′11″W

St Peter's Episcopal Church
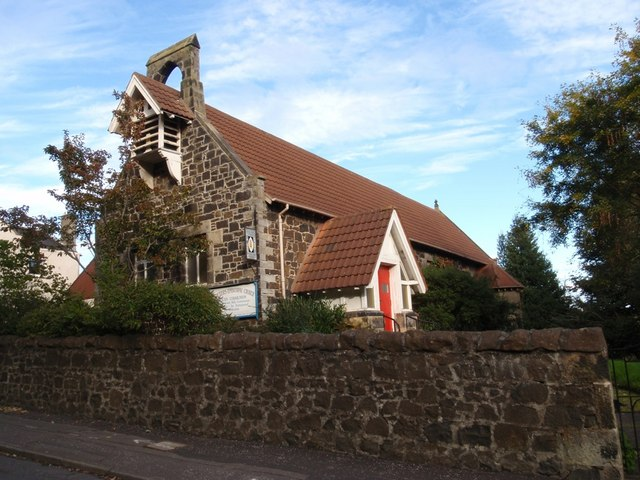
- St Peter's Episcopal Church from Hope Street.
- St Peter's Episcopal Church
- Location: Hope Street, Inverkeithing
- Country: Scotland
- Denomination: Episcopal
- Website: www.scotland.anglican.org/church/st-peter-inverkeithing/

Architecture
- Heritage designation: Category C Listed
- Designated: 04/08/2004
- Architect(s): Henry Francis Kerr ARIBA, FSAScot (1855-1946)
- Style: Arts and Crafts
- Years built: 1903 - 1910

Clergy
- Priest(s): Rev Canon Michael Parker, Interim Priest (2026)

Listed Building – Category C(S)
- Official name: Hope Street, St Peter's Episcopal Church Including Boundary Wall
- Designated: 3 August 2004
- Reference no.: LB49948

St Peter's Episcopal Church is an Episcopal church in the town of Inverkeithing in Fife, Scotland. Built between 1903 and 1910, the church is an example of Edwardian arts and crafts architecture.

== History ==
Postcard showing St Peter's Church within Witch Knowe, c. early 1900's.

In 1899, the bishop of St Andrews, Dunblane and Dunkeld was successfully petitioned for the construction of an episcopal mission church in Inverkeithing. This was to cater to the growing number of Episcopal Christians working in nearby Jamestown. In 1902, a site in Witch Knowe Park was purchased from Inverkeithing Town Council.

Henry F. Kerr was tasked with the design and building of the church. He had been president of the Edinburgh Architectural Association in 1900, and was known for his domestic and church architecture built in Edinburgh, and the arts and crafts style. The nave was completed in 1903 and dedicated on 13 June 1903 by Bishop Wilkinson.

A later extension forming the new chancel was dedicated on 30 October 1910.

10 members of St Peter's Episcopal Church congregation were killed during the First World War, their names kept in a roll of honour within the church.

The interior was altered in 1980 to form a worship area and hall.

== Architecture ==
St Peter's Episcopal church is built in an Edwardian arts and crafts architectural style.

The church is oriented east–west. It is built of stone with a pitched roof covered in red tiles. All the east end windows are of coloured and frosted glass. There is a simple bellcote at the west end.

== Listed Status ==
In August 2004, Historic Scotland awarded the church with category C listed status. In their statement of special interest, they note the church is "an example of Arts and Crafts church architecture somewhat unusual to the local area".

== Current use ==
The church is now used as a community hall, with services carried out at Inverkeithing High School (2022). The current interim priest is Rev Canon Mihael Parker (2026).
