= Inverkeithing Baptist Church =

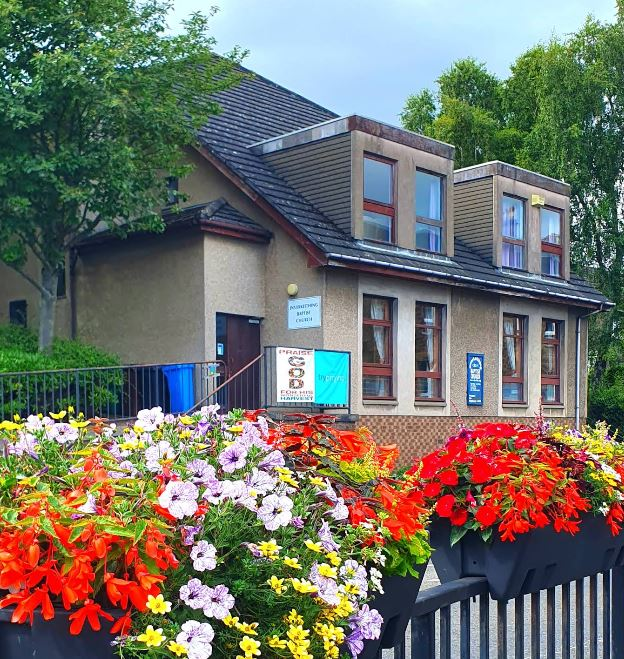
- Inverkeithing Baptist Church, west front.
- Inverkeithing Baptist Church
- 56.03256°N 3.39718°W
- Location: Church Street, Inverkeithing
- Country: Scotland
- Denomination: Baptist
- Website: www.ibcfife.org

Architecture
- Heritage designation: NRHE ID: 378389
- Years built: 1917; rebuilt 1980

Inverkeithing Baptist Church is a Baptist church in the town of Inverkeithing in Fife, Scotland.

== History ==
The first recorded meeting of Inverkeithing Baptist Church took place on 12 December 1903, and following its success, particularly among quarry workers, a Church was founded in 1905.

A church building was opened on 14 August 1917.

On 7 April 1941, during a WWII bombing raid on Inverkeithing by the Luftwaffe, a two inch shell penetrated the church roof and lodged in the floor.

In 1980, the modern day Inverkeithing Baptist Church was constructed on the same site of the original church.

On 5 May 1987 the church was burned by arson. The ground was consecrated to God before rebuilding again, and was re opened on 16 November 1989.

== Present day ==
Inverkeithing Baptist Church meet every Sunday, 11am - 12:30. The church has a weekly youth club, breakfast club, toddler club, coffee morning and bible study sessions (2026).

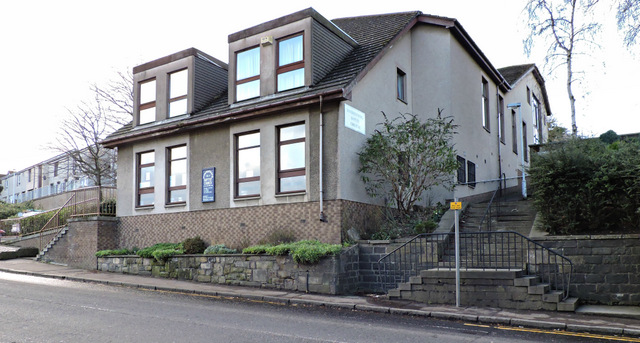
Inverkeithing Baptist Church, from the north side of Church Street.
