= Burgh Arms of Inverkeithing =

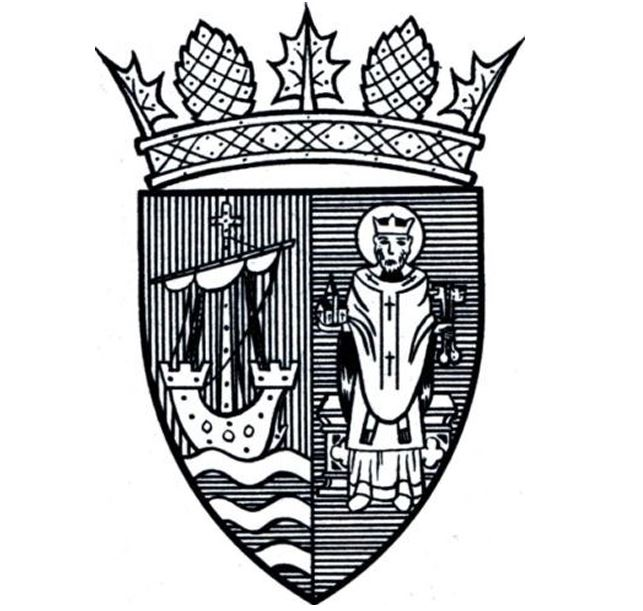
- Armiger: The Royal Burgh of Inverkeithing (1930 - 1975), Inverkeithing Community Council (1981-).
- Adopted: 1930

The Burgh Arms of Inverkeithing are a coat of arms granted to the town of Inverkeithing in Fife, Scotland. The arms are taken from the Burgh seal of Inverkeithing, dating from before 1296, and were granted to the town in 1930.

== History ==
Inverkeithing was granted royal burgh status by 1161. The Inverkeithing Burgh Arms are taken from the obverse and reverse of the oldest known Burgh seal, examples of which are on record from 1296 and 1357.

In 1315, Robert I granted Inverkeithing a Cocketi Seal, which contained the Royal Arms of Scotland and the words "SIG. COCKETI VILLE DE INVERKEDIN".

The Marquis of Bute, in The Arms of the Royal and Parliamentary Burghs of Scotland (1897) writes of the Burgh arms of Inverkeithing: "On the waves of the sea a ship with prow and stern sails furled, the mast summounted by a cross".

The arms were granted to the Royal Burgh of Inverkeithing on December 29, 1930. After the Local Government (Scotland) Act 1973 abolished Royal Burghs in 1975, the arms were given to the new Inverkeithing Community Council.

== Symbolism ==
The left hand side of the Arms depicts a ship, recalling “the passage and ship of Inverkeithing ” granted by David I of Scotland to the monks of Dunfermline in 1129.

The right hand side shows St Peter, patron saint of the Royal Burgh of Inverkeithing, holding his keys and a model of the parish church. The Saint's halo may refer to the connection Inverkeithing had, through its ferry, with the shrine of St Margaret at Dunfermline.
