= Castlandhill =

Castlandhill is a hill and locality in Rosyth in Fife, Scotland. It is 10 miles northwest of Edinburgh.

Castlandhill from below in Rosyth.

Located overlooking the Firth of Forth, the hill has a summit of 85m (279ft). Castlandhill sits on the Fife Pilgrim Way.

== Geography ==
Castlandhill is a distinctive hill with relatively steep slopes rising to a distinctive peak or plateau, is outcrop of igneous rock and is part of the “Coastal Hills” landscape type.

Castlandhill has a summit of 85m (279ft), which is marked by a trig point installed in 1948.

Since 2019, the Fife Pilgrim Way runs a footpath through Castlandhill. The footpath running through Castlandhill offers panoramic views of the Firth of Forth.

Castlandhill sits between Rosyth and Inverkeithing. It is 3.5 miles from Dunfermline and 10 miles from Edinburgh.

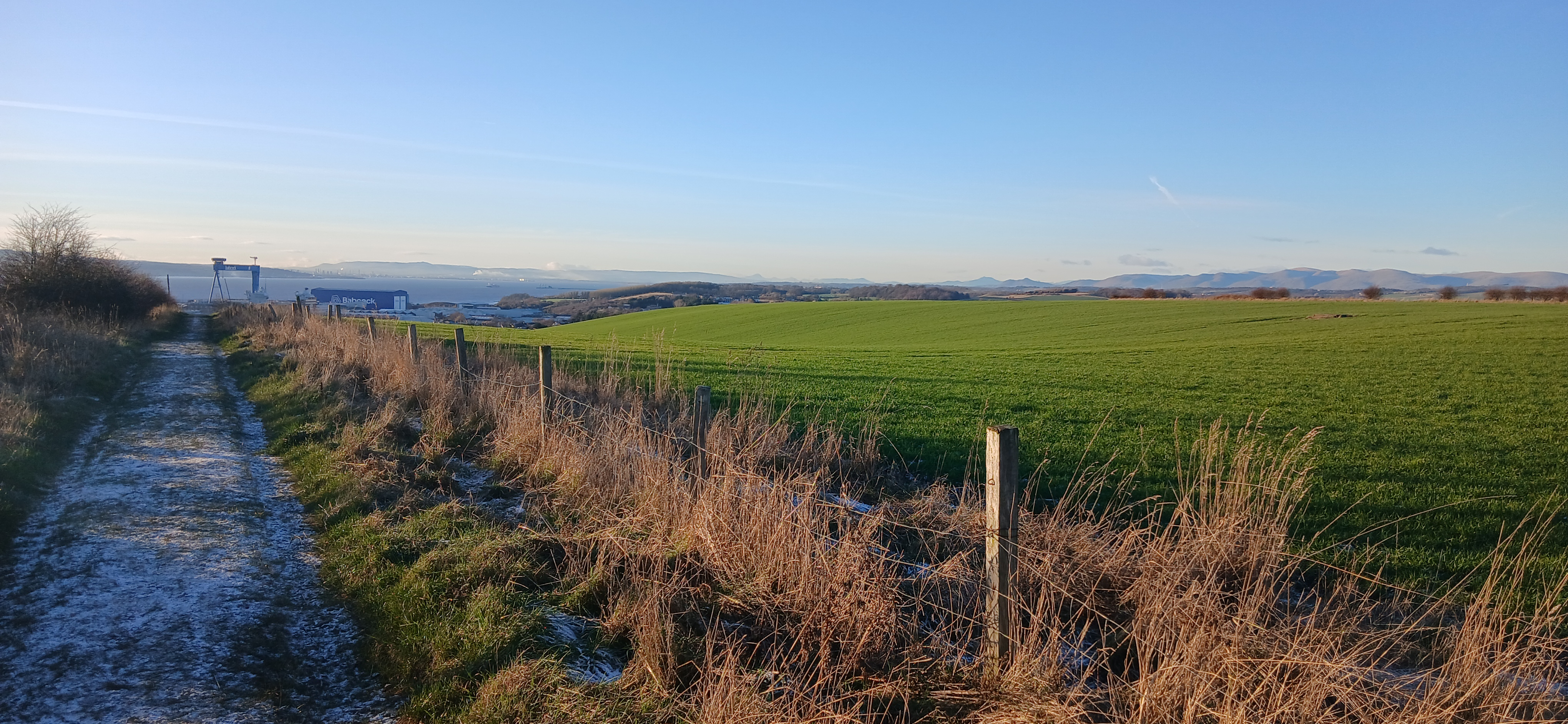
The view west towards Rosyth.

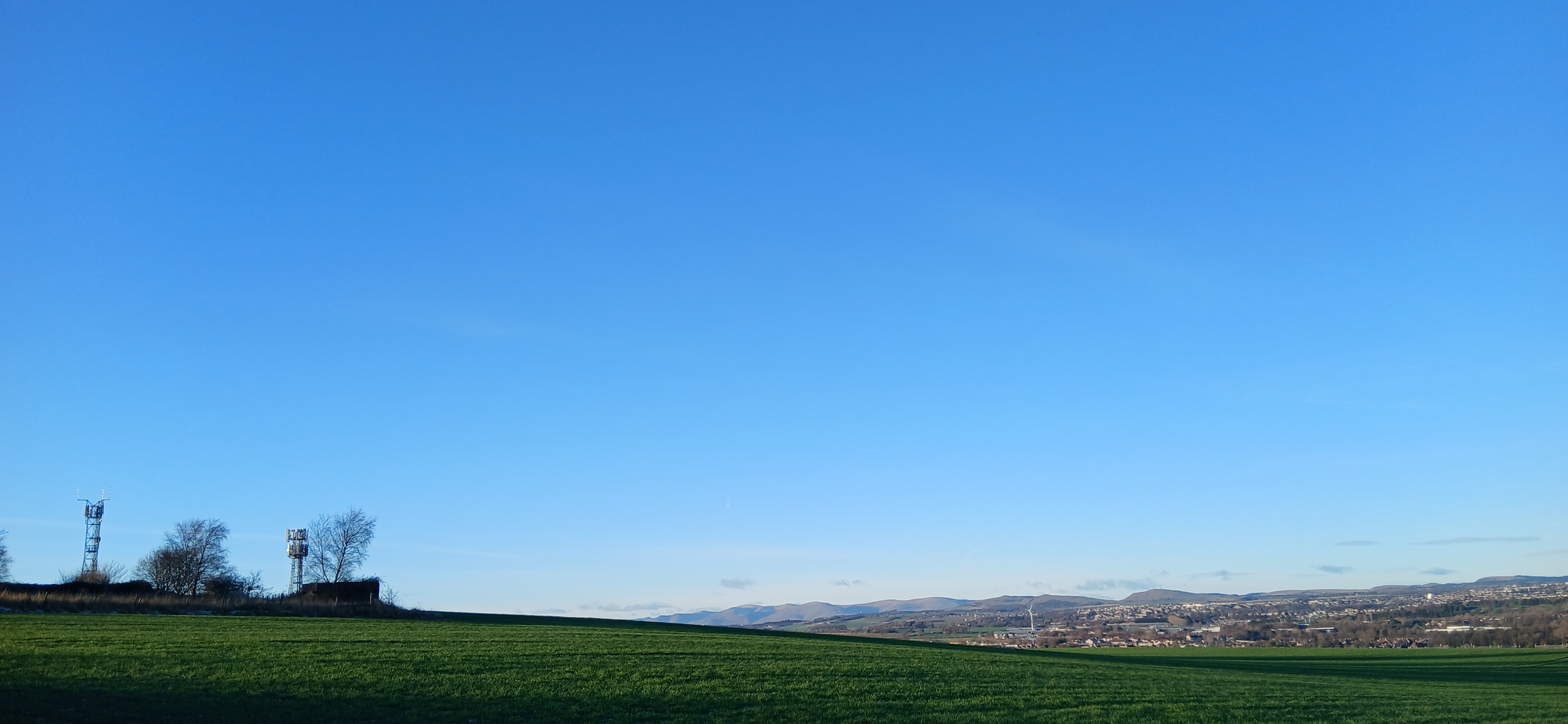
View North towards Dunfermlinel.

View south towards the Forth Bridges.

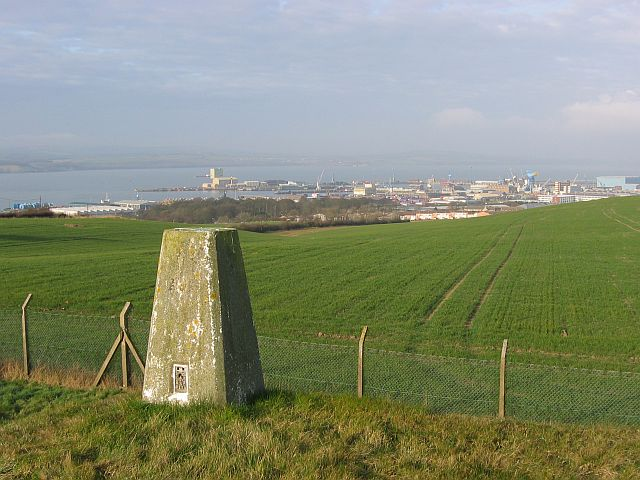
Triangulation pillar with the Firth of Forth in the background.

== History ==
=== Prehistory ===
Human activity in the form of tool making and possibly habitation at Castlandhill likely dates back to the Mesolithic era. Archaeology Scotland in 2011 reported finding lithic artefacts (stone tool “cores and tools”), which demonstrate the use of Mesolithic technology in the manufacture of stone tools at Castlandhill. Other mesolithic features found included a hearth, small gullies and large pits.

=== Early Modern era ===
During the Battle of Inverkeithing in 1651, Castlandhill was where the initial deployment of Scottish troops was made, and the point from where they retreated.

It is likely a mine for lead and coal was established at Castlandhill in 1764, and was mined out by the 1790's.

=== Modern era ===
Castlandhill has a First World War radio station and radio mast. Castlandhill also has First World War pillboxes.

In 2000, the movie Complicity was filmed at Lothians View, Castlandhill.

As of 2024, there are plans to build 550 new homes on Castlandhill by Alfred Stewart Property Foundation, as well as development for tourism and leisure uses and a public woodland park.

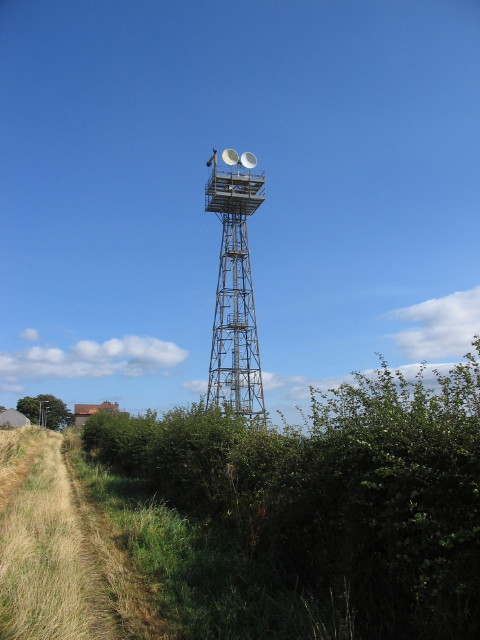
Communications tower..

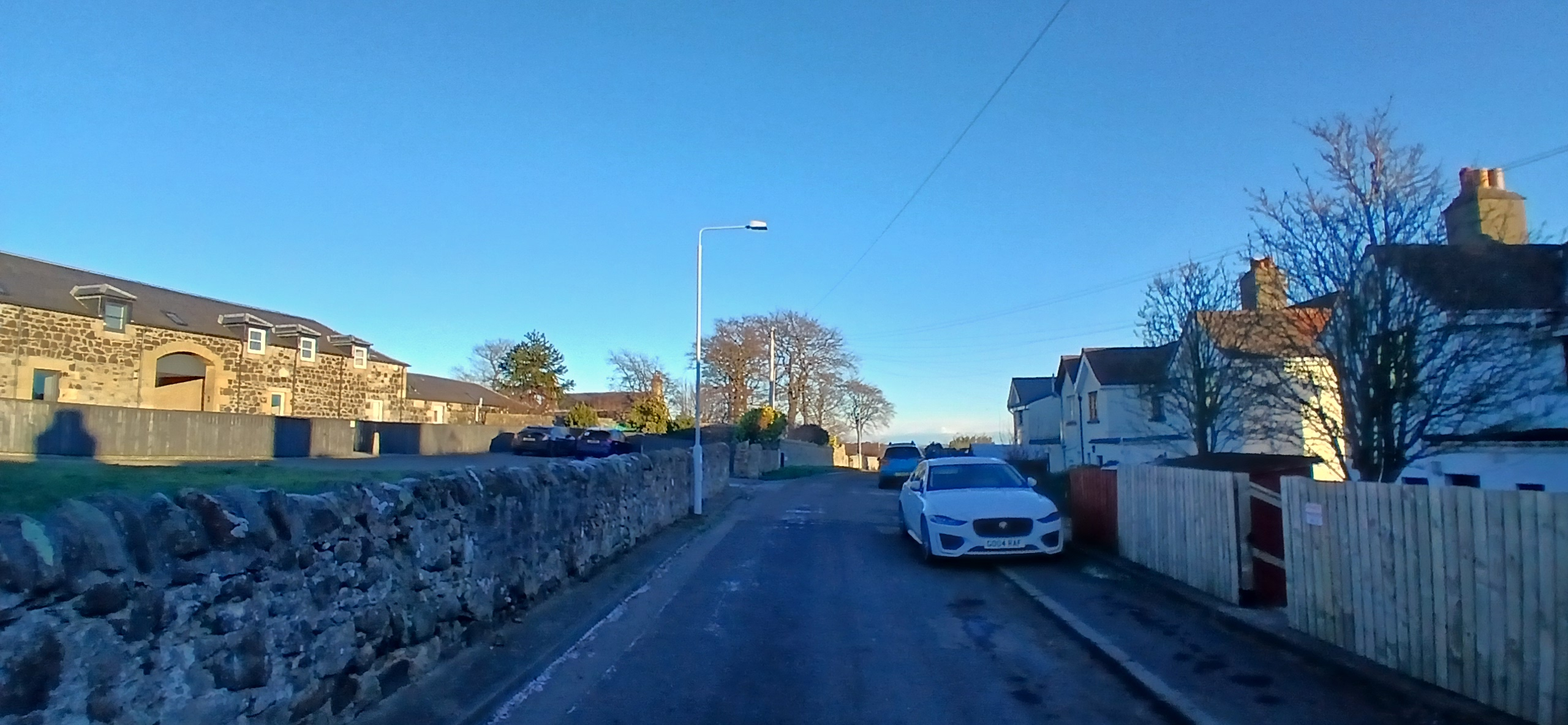
Lothians View, Castlandhill.

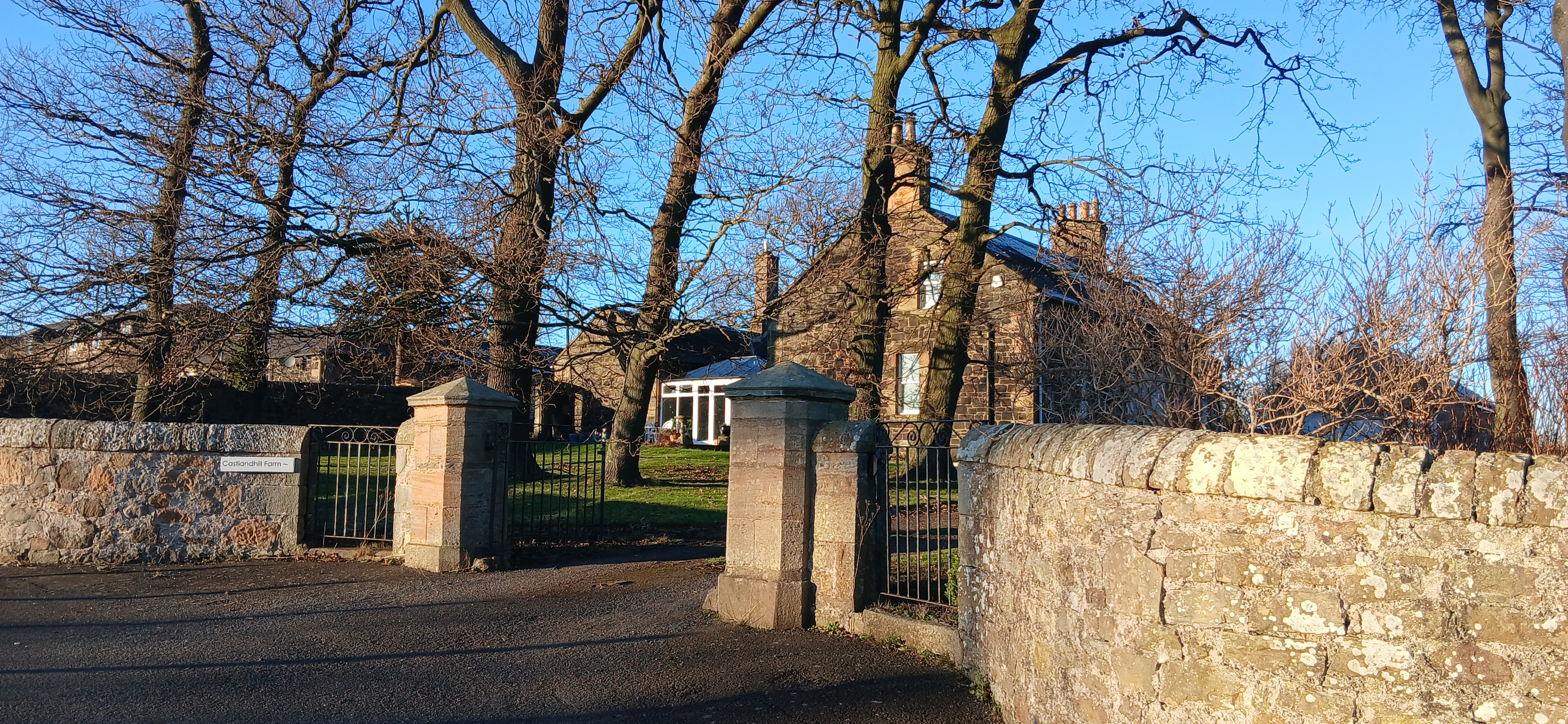
Castlandhill Farm.

Historic converted residential farm building.
