= Providence House =

Coordinates: 56°01′50″N 3°23′51″W

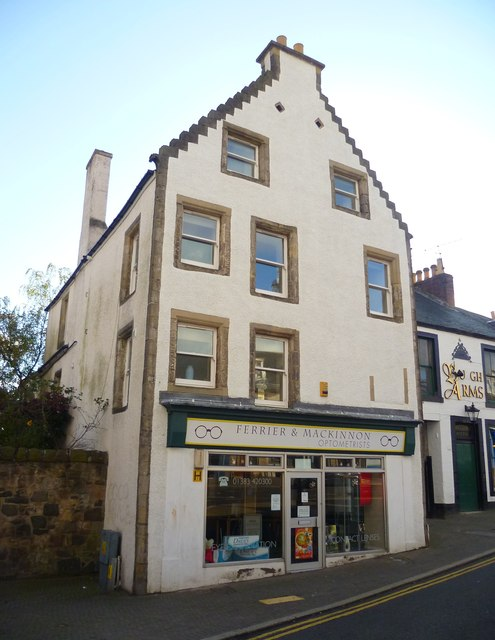
- Providence House.
- Interactive map of Providence House

History
- Built: 1688

Listed Building – Category B
- Official name: 12, 14, 18 HIGH STREET, PROVIDENCE HOUSE
- Designated: 12 July 1985
- Reference no.: LB35096

Providence House is a traditional 17th century burgh house in Inverkeithing in Fife, Scotland. The house is notable for its high state of preservation and stone carvings to the doorway.

== History ==
On June 19, 1670, John Blackadder stayed on the site of Providence House (number 18) on his journey to take part in the Conventicle at Hill of Beath, an important moment in Scottish Convenanting. Steven (1938) suggested this as evidence for the town of Inverkeithing generally being on the side of the Covenanters in the late 17th century.

Records show Isobel Bairdie, daughter of John Bairdie of Salvege (near Inverkeithing), and her husband Alexander Anderson, a burgess of Inverkeithing, bought the house from James Kinglassie in 1687.

In 1688, the original house was extended. The house became and remains a prominent, 3 storey with attic burgh tenement. The gable of Providence House is prominent, and marks the end of the wider section of High Street.

On the keystone above the doorway, Isobel Bairdie's initials - "I.B." - were engraved. Also engraved is "GODS PROVIDENCE IS MY INHERITANCE" with the year 1688.

On her husband's death, Isobel inherited the house.

The house was the subject of J. Gibson's painting "Providence House, Inverkeithing" in the 1970s.

The house was awarded Category B listed status by Historic Scotland in July 1985. Their statement of special interest says Providence House "...belongs to a small group of important 17th century burgess houses still standing in the core of Inverkeithing's historic burgh".

In the late 20th century, a glass shop front was added to the ground floor.

== Photographs ==
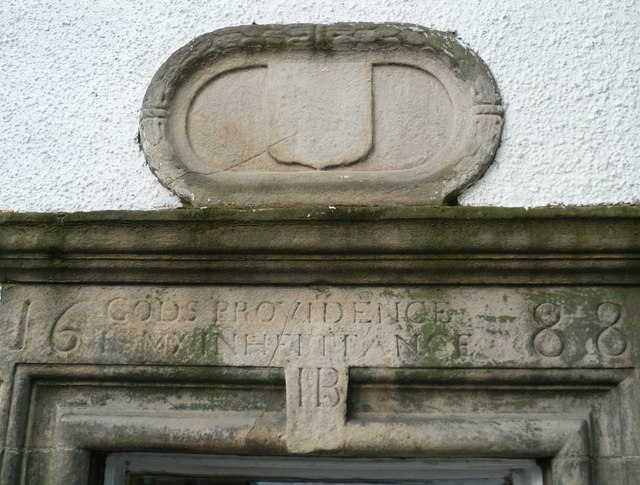
Carved Stone Lintel above the doorway.

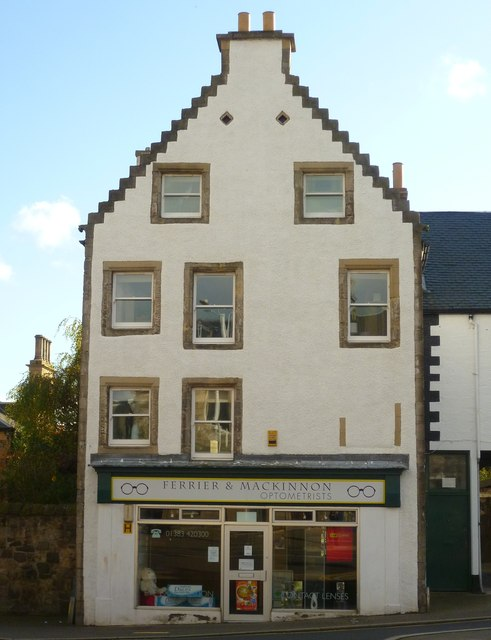
Providence House, west elevation.
