= Spencerfield House =

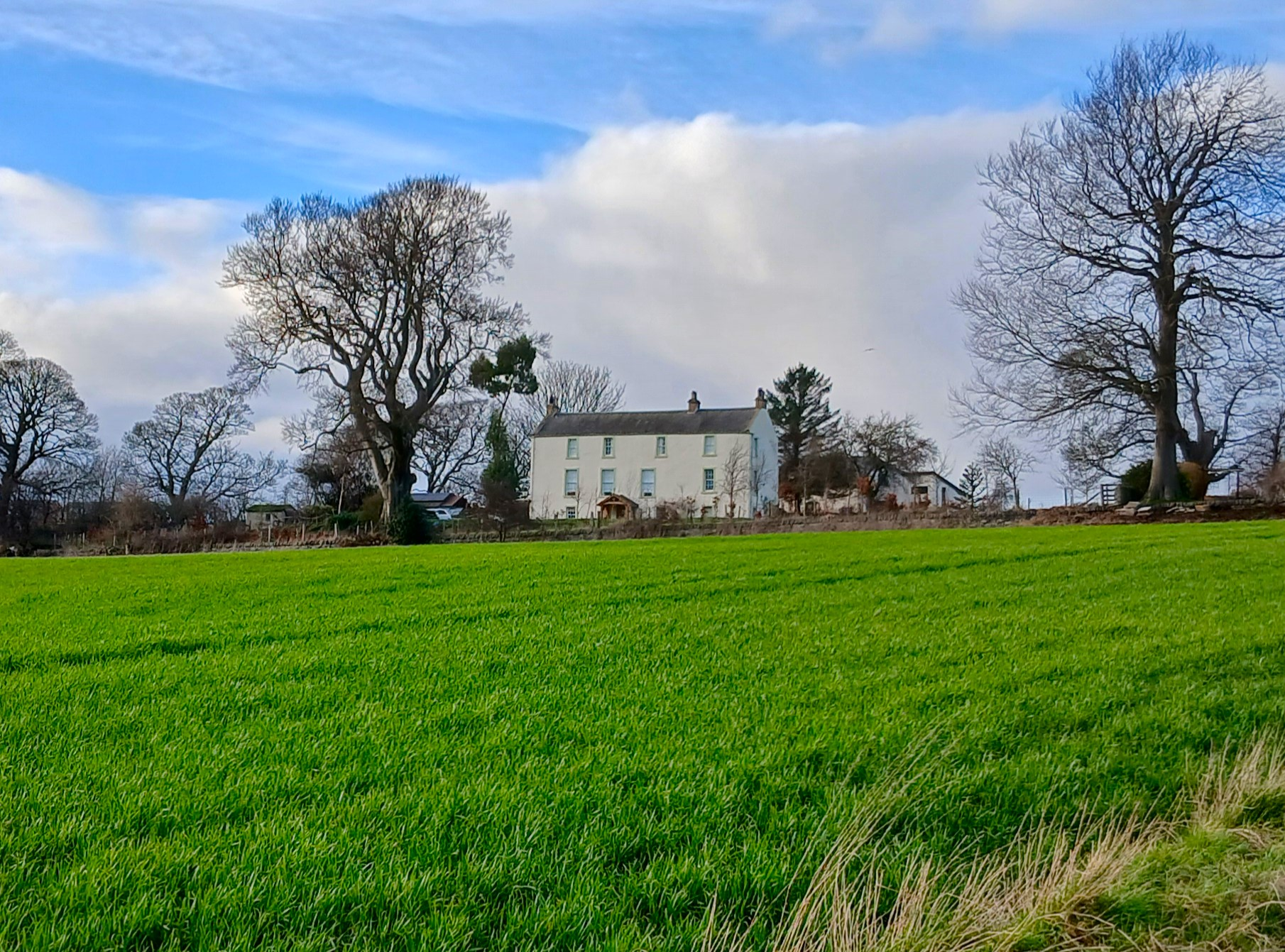
- Spencerfield House from public footpath.

- Location within Fife
- 56°02′05″N 3°22′52″W
- Location: Inverkeithing

History
- Built: c. 1592
- Built for: Henry Scott (d. 1616)

Listed Building – Category B
- Official name: Hillend, Spencerfield House Including Gatepiers and Boundary Wall
- Designated: 13 December 1991
- Reference no.: LB12957

Spencerfield House is a laird's tower house in Inverkeithing in Fife, Scotland. It was built by Henry Scott around 1592.

== History ==
Spencerfield House was built by Henry Scott, likely shortly after his marriage to Elizabeth Henderson of Fordell in 1592. Henry Scott died in 1616, and Elizabeth Henderson died in 1622; the Henderson (Scott) family descendants would own the property until 1704.

The land around Spencerfield House is known as Spencerfield farm and has been farmed since the 17th century. Up to the 20th century, Spencerfield's farm land was "40 acres adjacent to Inverkeithing Bay and the Forth".

In The History of Inverkeithing and Rosyth (1921), Rev. W. Steven writes that following the Battle of Inverkeithing in 1651, the town was occupied by General George Monck and under his occupation Spencerfield House was raided by Cromwell's troops, who stole "a great quantity of silver plate, arras, hingings [sic], carpets, and other household plenishings".

The change in ownership of Spencerfield House over the 18th century is as follows:

- James Craig, writer (1704 - 1710)
- Sir John Shaw of Greenock (1710 - 1712)
- John Dundas of Duddingston (1712 - 1721)
- Brigadier General Preston (1721 - 1797)

William Erskine purchased Spencerfield House in 1797, and began Georgian renovations to the house. These included enlarging windows and altering the floor heights.

In the 20th century, a two-storey extension was added to the northwest aspect of the house.

== Description ==
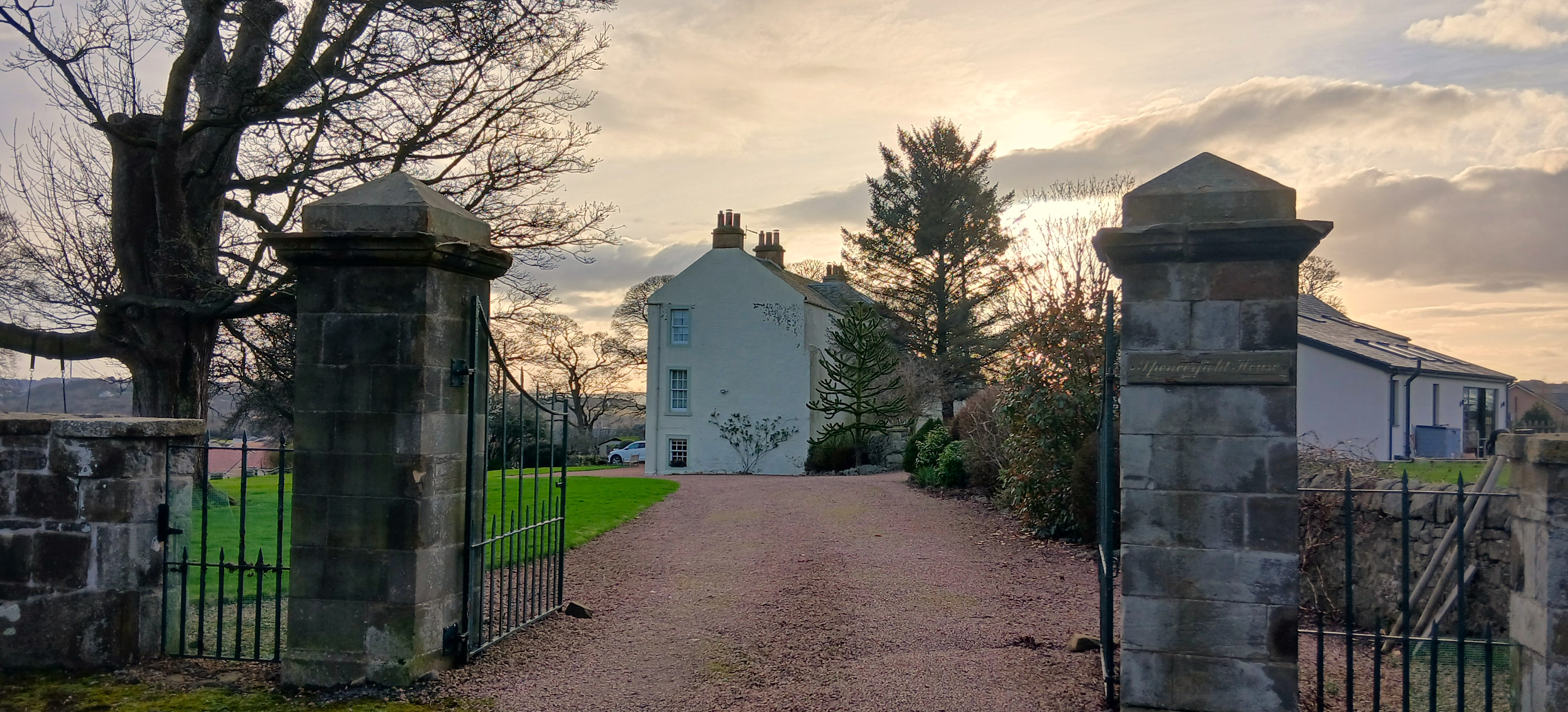
Spencerfield House entrance gates from The Avenue road

Spencerfield House is a 3 storey, 3 bay rectangular-plan laird's house. The house features a staircase tower to the north aspect. Some 16th and 17th century features survive in the interior.

== Listed status ==
In December 1991, Historic Scotland awarded Spencerfield House category B listed status. Spencerfield House remains category B listed (2026).
