= Fairykirk =

Woodland and scrubland in Fife, Scotland

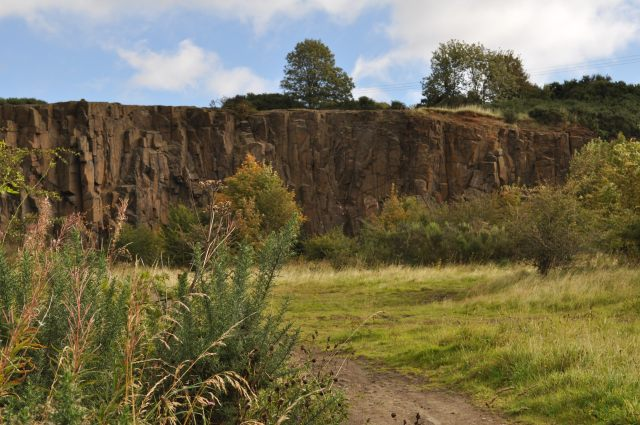
Fairykirk quarry, Fairykirk, Inverkeithing.

Fairykirk is a hilly woodland and shrubland in Inverkeithing in Fife, Scotland. It is part of Ferry Hills Site of Special Scientific Interest nature protected area.

== History ==
Fairykirk is first documented on an 1856 Ordnance Survey map. According to the OS Name Book, the name refers to ‘a small cliff on the top of a steep brow, supposed by some to be a resort of fairies'. Fairy Kirk road in neighbouring Rosyth takes its name from Fairykirk.

A small open cast stone quarry, Fairykirk quarry, once operated at Fairykirk.

On 22 February 1992, 1.72 hectares of Fairykirk was designated as part of the Ferry Hills site of special scientific interest by NatureScot.

== Recreation ==
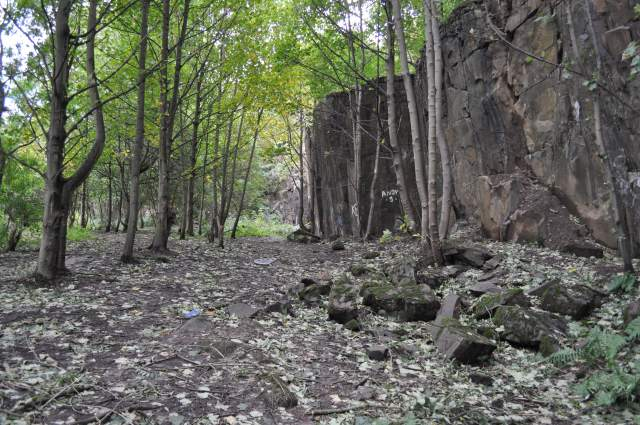
Woodland trail through Fairykirk.

Fairykirk is currently scrubland and wooded hilltops. According to Fife Council, Fairykirk represents a popular area with walkers, dog walkers, mountain bikers, and climbers.
