= Prestonhill Quarry =

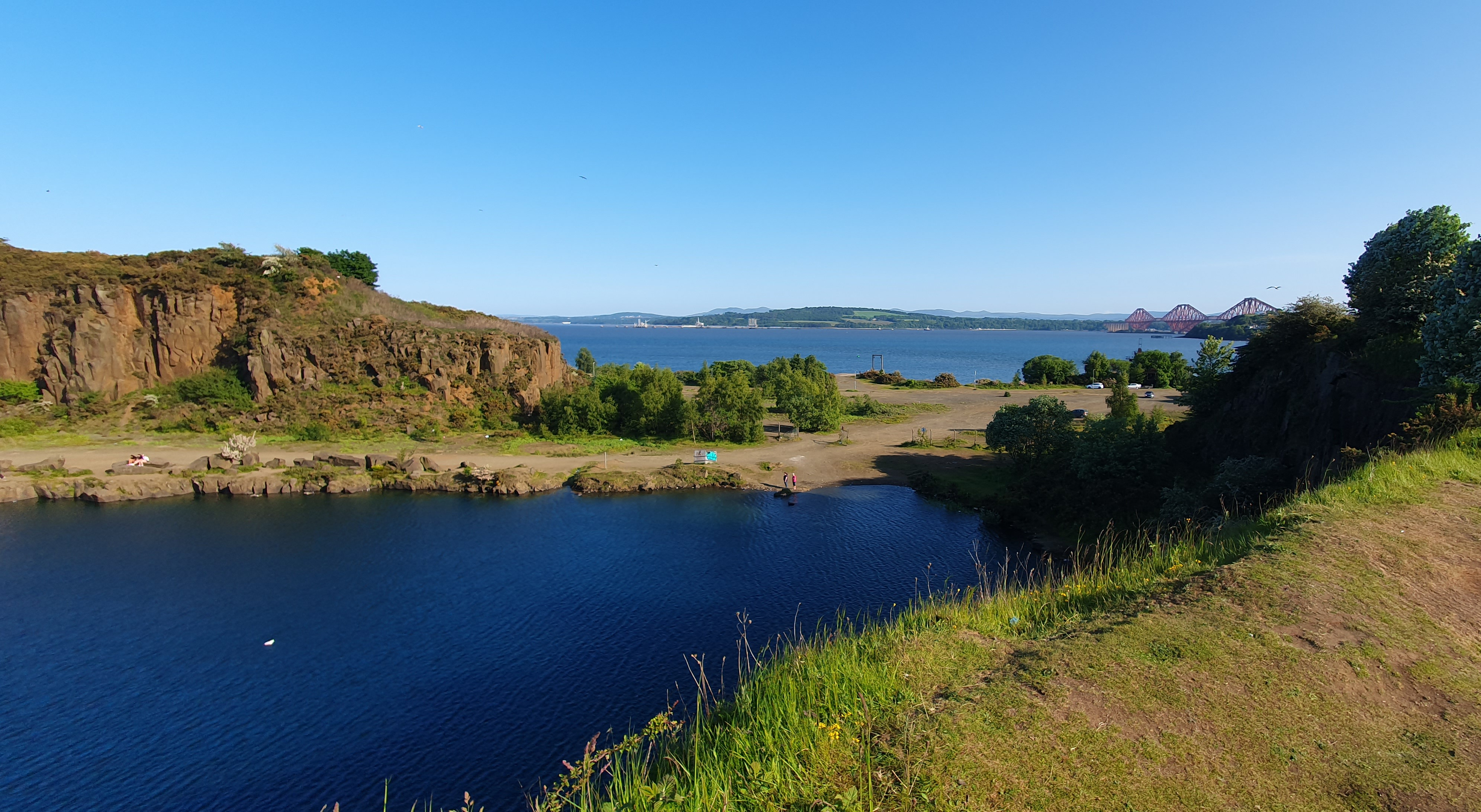
- Prestonhill Quarry looking South.

- Location in Fife
- Location: Inverkeithing, Fife,,Scotland; 56°01′41″N 3°23′14″W
- Products: Dolerite
- Type: Quarry
- Opened: 1896
- Closed: 1980's

Prestonhill Quarry is a former dolerite quarry near Inverkeithing in Fife, Scotland.

== Geography ==
Prestonhill Quarry is a quarry of igneous and metamorphic rock. The quarry is located adjacent to Inverkeithing Bay, an inlet of the Firth of Forth. The formerly excavated area is now water-filled to create a current deep water pond bound by rocky cliffs.

== History ==
Prestonhill Quarry during its operation, c. early 20th century.

Quarrying began for dolerite rock at the site in 1896 and continued for nearly a century. Over this time, it is estimated up to 2 million square meters of rock were taken from the site.

In the 1980s, the quarry ceased to be used. The excavated area was water-filled. The pond is 11 meters deep. The former loading pier opposite the quarry is still present.

Prestonhill Quarry was an important diving training facility. The quarry pond was used by people from the fire and rescue service and the Royal Navy.

In 2022, plans to build 180 houses on the 44 acre site were put forward; they were rejected in 2025 due to "the adverse impact of the proposals on Inverkeithing and its surrounding natural heritage", but were accepted on appeal in 2026.

== Leisure activity ==
The quarry is adjacent to the Fife Coastal Path, and is used as a recreation space. Scenic walking paths allow walking above and below the quarry.
