= Rosebery House, Inverkeithing =

Rosebery House
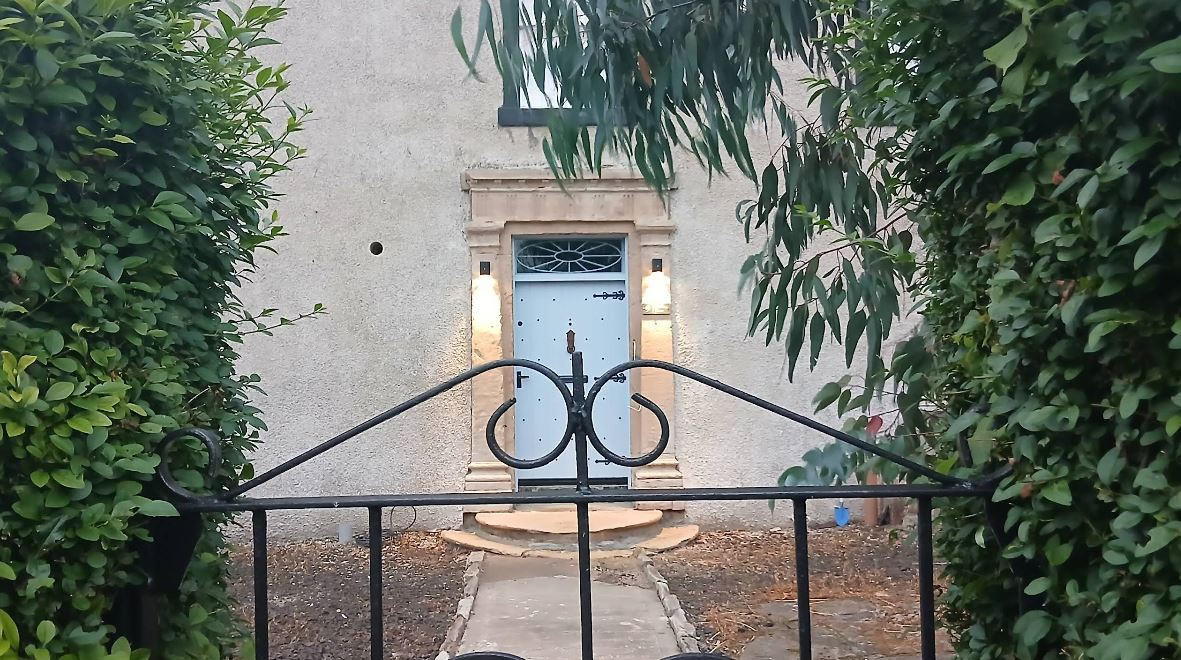
- Rosebery House, front entrance (2025).

- Location within Fife
- 56°01′53″N 3°23′45″W
- Location: King Street, Inverkeithing

History
- Built: Circa early 16th century

Site notes
- Owner: Earl of Rosebery

Listed Building – Category B
- Official name: 9 King Street, Rosebery House, Including Well, Marriage Lintel To Back Garden, Boundary Walls And Gatepiers
- Designated: 11 December 1972
- Reference no.: LB35106

Rosebery House is an early 16th century townhouse in Inverkeithing in Fife, Scotland. Possibly the oldest surviving residence in Inverkeithing, the house is notable for its unusual lean-to roof and connections with the Earl of Rosebery.

== History ==
Rosebery House is possibly the oldest surviving house of the former Royal burgh of Inverkeithing. In History of Inverkeithing and Rosyth (1921), Rev. W. Stephen speculates that the early core of Rosebery house indicates it could date from the 15th century; vaulted rooms inside the house confirms it dates no later than the early 16th century.

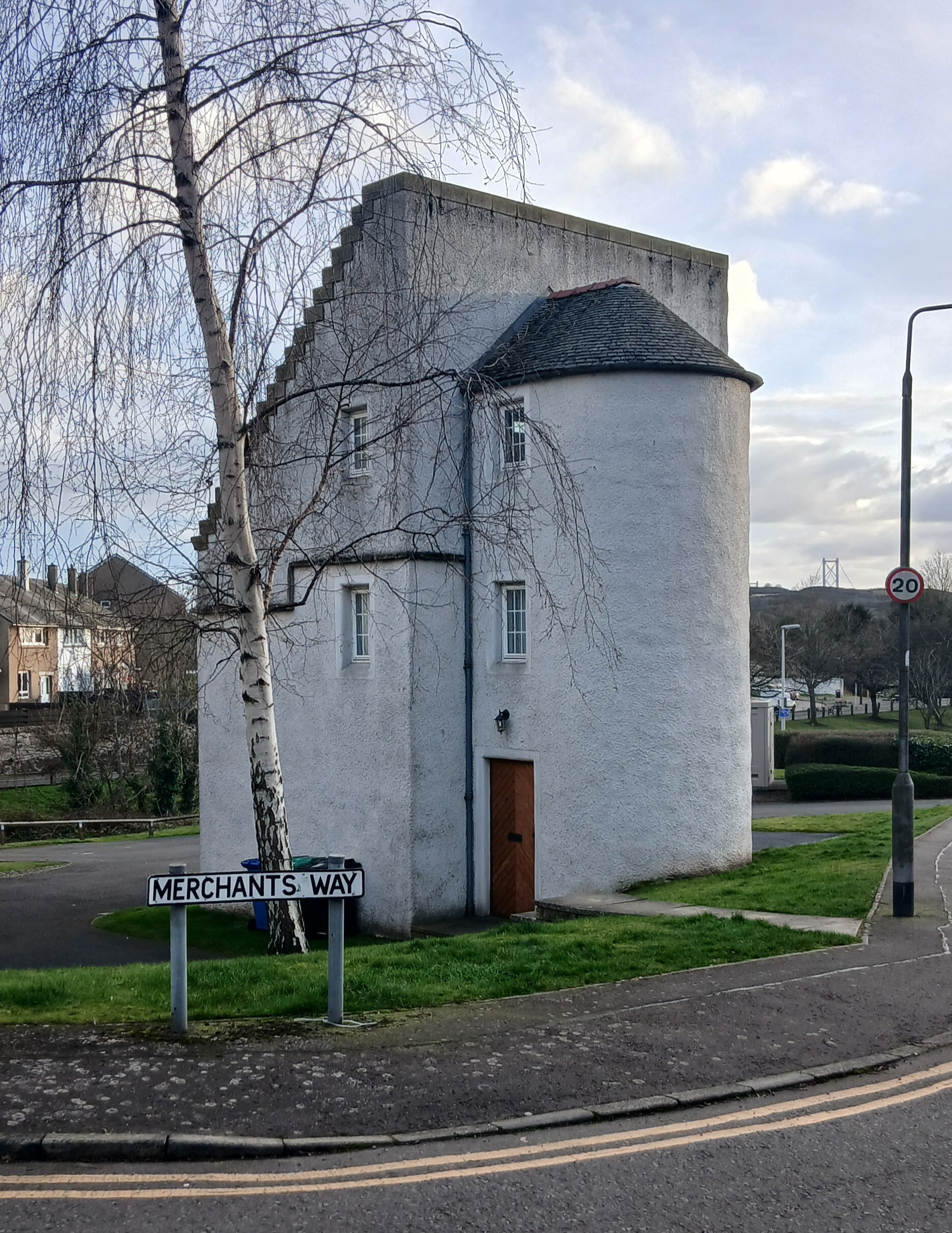
Rosebery Doocot, Merchants Way.

In the late 17th century, Rosebery Doocot was constructed in Rosebery House orchard: a source of meat and manure, and a symbol of status.

The house was partially rebuilt during the 17th century, and was extended to the west between 1705 and 1711 when it was owned by the Earl of Rosebery, a peerage created in 1703 by Queen Anne.

The house was sold by Rosebery to John Dundas, surgeon apothecary, and Beatrice Ferguson in 1711. The Walker family, one of whom was Town Clerk of Inverkeithing, then owned the house until 1852.

In the 20th century, the house began use as a bed and breakfast accommodation.

The property began a restoration program after 2024 to preserve the building and turn Rosebery House back into a family home.

== Architecture ==
The building is in simplified Scottish baronial style, and is set out as an L plan town house. The unusual lean-to roof is locally known as a 'toofall'. The ground floor is part vaulted. The house features influence from the Gothic style, including in arch openings and doorways.

== Listed status ==
In December 1972, Rosebery House was granted Category B listed status by Historic Scotland. In their statement of interest, Historic Scotland notes: "Possibly the earliest surviving house in the burgh, the vaulted rooms indicate a date no later than the early 16th century". Rosebery House is listed separately but in the same category as Rosebery Doocot.
