= The Burgh Arms, Inverkeithing =

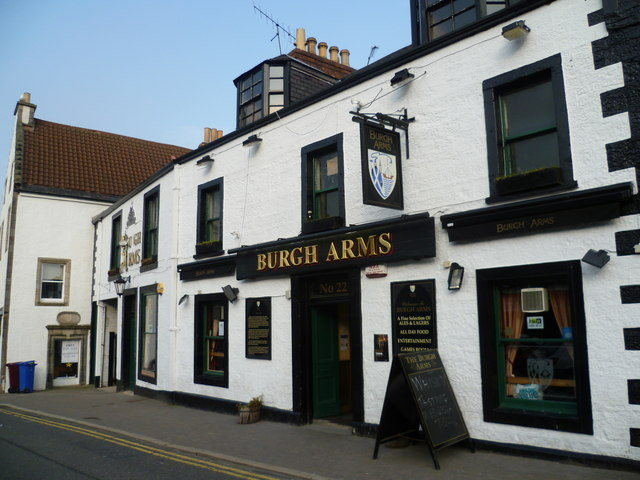
- The Burgh Arms Inverkeithing, from Inverkeithing High Street (2011).

- Shown in Fife.
- 56°01′49″N 3°23′53″W
- Location: 16, 20, 22 High Street [Inverkeithing[

History
- Built: 1664; extended 1888.

Listed Building – Category C(S)
- Official name: 16, 20, 22 HIGH, STREET BURGH ARMS HOTEL
- Designated: 11/12/1972
- Reference no.: LB35097

The Burgh Arms is a public house in Inverkeithing in Fife, Scotland. The building dates from 1888, built on the site of a house dating to 1664. The pub was formerly known as the Burgh Arms Hotel.

== History ==
The Burgh Arms was built on the site of a house dating from 1664. In 1888, the house was extended to form the Burgh Arms hotel. Extensive 19th and 20th century additions were made to the rear of the building.

James Boswell, biographer of Samuel Johnson, stayed in the house on the Burgh Arms site on one of his many journeys.

In December 1972, the Burgh Arms was awarded category C listed status by Historic Scotland. Subsequently, the Burgh Arms use changed from hotel to public house.

The interior features an original stone fireplace and decorative plaster cornice; most of the fabric to pub interior has been replaced. In 2024, external works were undertaken to enhance the character and appearance of the Burgh Arms.

== Photographs ==
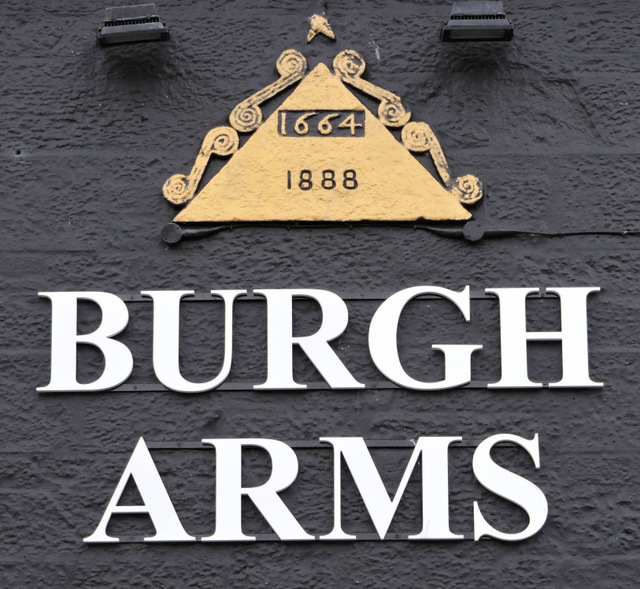
Burgh Arms sign and pediment with the dates 1664 and 1888.

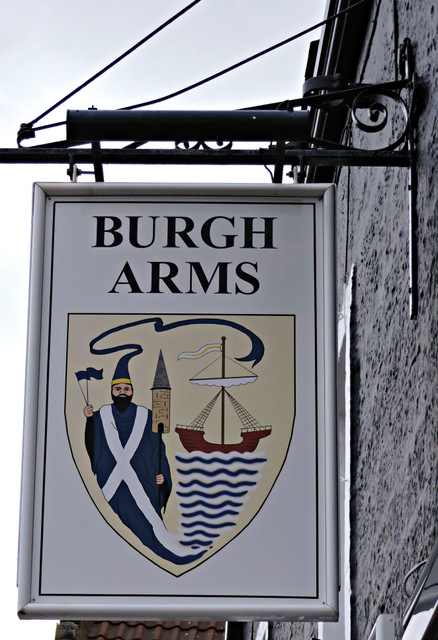
Burgh Arms crest sign.
