= James Anderson (farm manager) =

Scottish born farm manager

James Anderson was a Scottish born farm manager who served between 1796 and 1802 as steward of George Washington's Mount Vernon estate.

Anderson was responsible for Mount Vernon's shift to whisky distilling in 1798. Having a trusted relationship with George Washington, Anderson carried out Washington's long term plans for Mount Vernon after his death in 1799 until the death of Martha Washington in 1802.

== Early life ==
Anderson was born and raised near the town of Inverkeithing in Fife, Scotland. He married Helen Gordon of Inverkeithing, and the couple had seven children.

In the 1790's, Anderson immigrated to the United States with his wife and seven children.

== Mount Vernon ==
Washington wrote to James Anderson in 1796 on the qualities he wanted from a farm manager of Mount Vernon, which included "Besides being sober, & a man of integrity, he must possess a great deal of activity and firmness, to make the under Overseers do their duty strictly."

Anderson encouraged Washington to establish a whisky distillery in 1798; operational by the spring of that year, the distillery produced 11,000 gallons of whisky the following year at a value of over $7,500. Washington was initially skeptical of the plan.

Four days prior to his death, on 10th December 1799 George Washington wrote to James Anderson about his long term plans for Mount Vernon.

Anderson continued to manage Mount Vernon until 1802, when Martha Washington died.
