= Inverkeithing Conservation Area =

Conservation area in Fife, Scotland

Aerial footage of Inverkeithing conservation area (taken 2024).

Inverkeithing Conservation Area is a conservation area in Inverkeithing in Fife, Scotland. The conservation area focuses on the historic core of the town and the remaining medieval rigg pattern, and has been designated since 1985.

== Description ==
Inverkeithing was one of Fife's first royal burghs, in existence as such by 1161. Building layout of the conservation area was planned deliberately during the medieval era, and follows a rigg pattern of development, with buildings fronting on High Street and narrow plots of land behind.

Buildings within the conservation area typically date from the 17th century onwards. This is due to the destruction of great fires of 1378 and 1419-20, the former of which the Burgh was given a relief grant by the exchequer of £5, 6s. 8d; and destruction during the parliamentary military occupation of Inverkeithing following the Battle of Inverkeithing in 1651.

The conservation area extends from Inverkeithing war memorial and Heriot Street in the North to the Friary Gardens in the south.

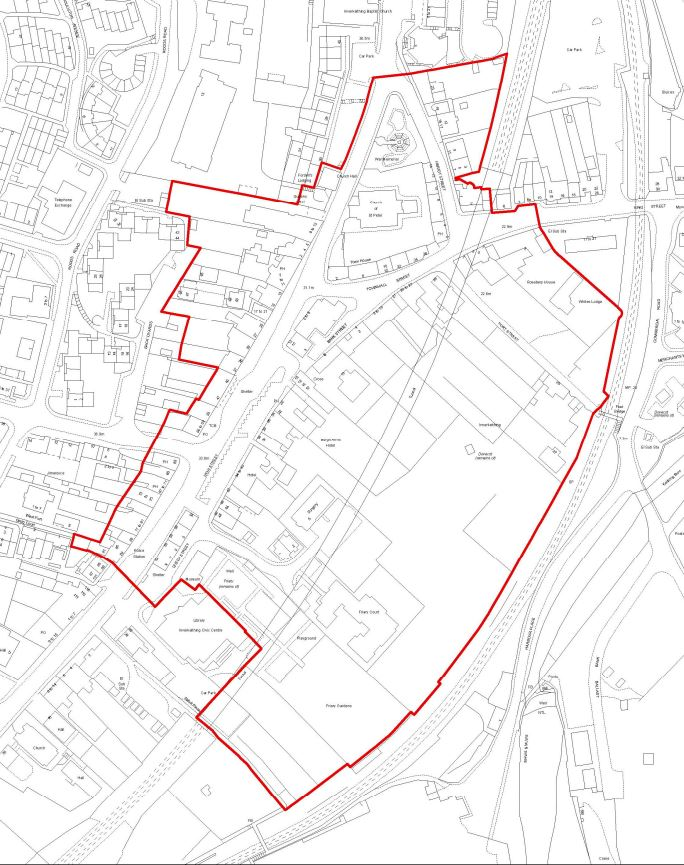
Inverkeithing Conservation Area boundary (2019).

Within Inverkeithing Conservation area, there are 28 Historic Scotland listed buildings. These include 5 of category A, 5 of category B and 18 of category C. The oldest surviving structures in the conservation area are the tower of Inverkeithing Parish Church and Inverkeithing Friary, both dating from the 14th century. The oldest surviving residential house is Rosebery House, likely dating from the 16th century.

Some other notable buildings within the conservation area include:

- Inverkeithing Mercat Cross
- Inverkeithing Town House
- Thomson's House
- Fordell's Lodging
- Moffat Cottage
- Inverkeithing War Memorial

Traditional shop fronts within Inverkeithing Conservation Area (2026).

Within the conservation area, roofs are typically pitched, with grey slates. Gables are usually finished as raised skews. External walling materials include the indigenous dolerite/ whinstone or sandstone buildings.

== Designation History ==
Inverkeithing was designated a conservation area in 1985 by Fife Council in recognition of its "historical and architectural significance".

The Planning (Listed Buildings and Conservation Areas) (Scotland) Act 1997 requires local councils to review conservation areas periodically. Inverkeithing Conservation Area was reviewed in February 2019; at the review, boundaries were expanded and rationalised. Major heritage regeneration works were approved in 2019 to the conservation area.
