= List of listed buildings in Inverkeithing, Fife =

This is a list of listed buildings in the parish of Inverkeithing in Fife, Scotland. This includes the settlements of Inverkeithing and North Queensferry.

== List ==
Name	Location	Date listed	Grid ref. (Note: Sometimes known as OSGB36, the grid reference (where provided) is based on the British national grid reference system used by the Ordnance Survey. • "Guide to National Grid". Ordnance Survey. • "Get-a-map". Ordnance Survey.)	Geo-coordinates	Notes	LB number (Note: Historic Environment Scotland assign a unique alphanumeric identifier to each designated site in Scotland, for listed buildings this always begins with "LB", for example "LB12345".)	Image
1 Bank Street (4, 4A High Street)				56°01′52″N 3°23′50″W	Category C(S)	35089	Upload Photo
2, 4 Bank Street, Thomson's House				56°01′52″N 3°23′49″W	Category A	35090	Upload another image See more images
8 Bank Street, Park House Stables				56°01′51″N 3°23′50″W	Category C(S)	35092	Upload Photo
10 Bank Street, Park House, Including Garden Terrace, Vaulted Cellars And Boundary Walls				56°01′50″N 3°23′49″W	Category B	35093	Upload Photo
Commercial Road, Rosebery Doocot				56°01′50″N 3°23′40″W	Category B	35108	Upload Photo
Dale's Farmhouse, Including Boundary Walls And Gatepiers				56°02′45″N 3°23′23″W	Category B	13351	Upload Photo
Hillend, Spencerfield House Including Gatepiers And Boundary Wall				56°02′04″N 3°22′52″W	Category B	12957	Upload Photo
Fordell Estate, Crowhill Plantation, Pitadro Doocot				56°03′15″N 3°22′28″W	Category B	9982	Upload Photo
North Queensferry, 10 Post Office Lane				56°00′34″N 3°23′37″W	Category C(S)	9990	Upload Photo
North Queensferry, Chapel Place, Clifton House				56°00′34″N 3°23′39″W	Category B	9997	Upload another image
North Queensferry, Pierhead, Lantern Tower				56°00′30″N 3°23′41″W	Category A	9998	Upload Photo
North Queensferry, Pierhead, Signal House, Including Entrance Gates And Boundary Wall				56°00′29″N 3°23′43″W	Category B	9999	Upload another image
North Queensferry, Northcliff, Including Former Laundry, Terraced And Walled Gardens, Gatepiers, Gates And Railings				56°00′43″N 3°24′00″W	Category B	47910	Upload Photo
North Queensferry, Brock Street, Whinney Knowe, North Queensferry Primary School Including Nursery And Kitchen Block, Playsheds, Boundary Walls, Gatepiers, And Railings				56°00′43″N 3°23′43″W	Category B	49038	Upload Photo
North Queensferry, Battery Road, Old Jail				56°00′32″N 3°23′36″W	Category C(S)	49166	Upload Photo
North Queensferry, 4 Ferryhills Road, Carlingnose Farmhouse				56°00′42″N 3°23′37″W	Category C(S)	49173	Upload Photo
North Queensferry, 12 Main Street, (Davidson's Buildings)				56°00′34″N 3°23′40″W	Category C(S)	49177	Upload Photo
North Queensferry, Main Street, K6 Telephone Kiosk				56°00′36″N 3°23′43″W	Category B	49231	Upload another image
Jamestown, Forth Bridge, North Approach Railway Viaduct				56°01′23″N 3°24′19″W	Category B	49652	Upload another image
Church Street, Inverkeithing War Memorial				56°01′55″N 3°23′48″W	Category C(S)	49941	Upload another image
1, 3, 5, 7, 9, 11 High Street, Central Bar				56°01′53″N 3°23′51″W	Category C(S)	49943	Upload Photo
Hillend Road, Inverkeithing High School				56°02′11″N 3°23′12″W	Category B	49945	Upload another image
Hope Street, Forth Bridge Approach Railway, Truss Bridge				56°01′35″N 3°24′10″W	Category B	49946	Upload another image
Hope Street, St Peter's Episcopal Church Including Boundary Wall				56°01′29″N 3°24′11″W	Category C(S)	49948	Upload Photo
9, 9A, 11, 13, 15, 17, 19, 21 (Odd Nos) Townhall Street				56°01′52″N 3°23′48″W	Category C(S)	49956	Upload Photo
North Queensferry, Railway Pier Including Associated Goods Yard Pier And Disembarkation Pier				56°00′26″N 3°23′58″W	Category B	43863	Upload Photo
Townhall Street, Town House				56°01′53″N 3°23′49″W	Category A	35087	Upload another image
2 King Street (1 Heriot Street), Including Boundary Walls And Gatepiers				56°01′54″N 3°23′46″W	Category C(S)	35107	Upload Photo
79 Hope Street, Viewforth				56°01′47″N 3°24′11″W	Category B	35112	Upload Photo
Fordell Estate, Pitadro House Including Sundial, Fountain And Gatepiers				56°03′17″N 3°22′31″W	Category B	49164	Upload Photo
North Queensferry, Main Road, Fernbank, Including Gatepiers, Boundary Walls, Garden Walls And Outbuildings				56°00′39″N 3°23′59″W	Category C(S)	49660	Upload Photo
Church Street, Standard Lamp				56°01′58″N 3°23′48″W	Category B	49940	Upload another image
Inverkeithing railway station, Including Timber Fence				56°02′06″N 3°23′43″W	Category B	49950	Upload Photo
King Street, Bridge Over Keithing Burn				56°01′54″N 3°23′36″W	Category C(S)	49951	Upload Photo
Roods Road, Inverkeithing Primary Schools, Including Boundary Walls And Playshed				56°01′57″N 3°23′54″W	Category C(S)	49955	Upload Photo
Bank Street, Inverkeithing Mercat Cross				56°01′51″N 3°23′51″W	Category A	35088	Upload another image See more images
10 High Street (3 Bank Street)				56°01′51″N 3°23′51″W	Category C(S)	35094	Upload Photo
13 Heriot Street, Moffat Cottage, Including Summerhouse				56°01′55″N 3°23′47″W	Category C(S)	35104	Upload Photo
Commercial Road, Bridge Over Keithing Burn				56°01′49″N 3°23′40″W	Category C(S)	35109	Upload another image
Old Duloch House, Including Former Stables, Boundary Walls, Gatepiers And Walled Garden				56°03′15″N 3°23′31″W	Category A	9981	Upload Photo
North Queensferry, 26, 28 Main Street (Black Cat Inn)				56°00′32″N 3°23′42″W	Category B	9984	Upload another image
North Queensferry, The Brae, Waterloo Well				56°00′38″N 3°23′41″W	Category B	9988	Upload Photo
North Queensferry, Helen Place, Melinkie Cottage				56°00′34″N 3°23′35″W	Category C(S)	9992	Upload Photo
North Queensferry, St Margaret's Hope, Gatelodge And Gatepiers				56°00′52″N 3°24′19″W	Category B	6406	Upload Photo
North Queensferry, Ferry Road, Seabank Cottage Including Boundary Walls				56°00′36″N 3°23′55″W	Category B	49171	Upload Photo
North Queensferry, 10 Ferryhills Road, Garthill House, Including Boundary Walls And Gatepiers				56°00′59″N 3°23′36″W	Category B	49174	Upload Photo
North Queensferry, The Brae, Pump And Plaque				56°00′36″N 3°23′40″W	Category C(S)	49180	Upload Photo
Church Street, Inverkeithing Parish Church (St Peter's Building; Church Of Scotland) Including Churchyard And Boundary Walls				56°01′54″N 3°23′49″W	Category B	35086	Upload another image See more images
Thomson's House Doocot (To Rear Of 2, 4 Bank Street)				56°01′49″N 3°23′46″W	Category C(S)	35091	Upload Photo
54, 56 High Street (1 Queen Street)				56°01′48″N 3°23′55″W	Category C(S)	35099	Upload Photo
58, 60 Church Street, Inverkeithing Parish Church (St John's Building; Church Of Scotland) Including Adjoining Hall And Offices, Boundary Walls And Railings				56°02′02″N 3°23′49″W	Category B	35113	Upload another image See more images
North Queensferry, 2 Post Office Lane				56°00′34″N 3°23′39″W	Category B	9989	Upload another image
North Queensferry, Hill House Including Boundary Wall And Well				56°00′38″N 3°23′47″W	Category B	9996	Upload another image
North Queensferry, 16 Main Street, Weston House (Davidson's Buildings)				56°00′33″N 3°23′41″W	Category C(S)	49178	Upload Photo
North Queensferry, Battery Road, East And West Battery Piers Including Shoring And Viewing Area Below Forth Bridge North Cantilever, And Boundary Walls				56°00′24″N 3°23′26″W	Category A	43862	Upload another image
16, 20, 22 High Street, The Burgh Arms Hotel				56°01′50″N 3°23′52″W	Category C(S)	35097	Upload Photo
Queen Street, The Friary Including Well And Vaulted Cellars				56°01′47″N 3°23′54″W	Category A	35100	Upload Photo
North Queensferry, Main Street, Brae House And White House				56°00′37″N 3°23′45″W	Category C(S)	9974	Upload Photo
Forth Bridge				55°59′54″N 3°23′15″W	Category A	9977	Upload another image See more images
North Queensferry, Town Pier				56°00′27″N 3°23′43″W	Category A	9978	Upload another image
North Queensferry, Ferryhills Road, North Queensferry Station Including Fence And Footbridge				56°00′45″N 3°23′40″W	Category B	9979	Upload Photo
North Queensferry, Battery Road, Royal Naval Signal Station Cottages, Including Gatelodge And Boundary Walls				56°00′26″N 3°23′24″W	Category B	9980	Upload Photo
North Queensferry, The Brae				56°00′36″N 3°23′41″W	Category B	9987	Upload Photo
North Queensferry, St Margaret's Hope, Including Boundary Walls, Walled Garden To South And Archway On Drive To North				56°00′53″N 3°24′29″W	Category B	6405	Upload Photo
Fordell Estate, North West Gate (Off B981)				56°03′27″N 3°22′56″W	Category C(S)	49163	Upload Photo
North Queensferry, Ferry Road, Craigdhu, Including Boundary Walls And Gatepiers				56°00′35″N 3°24′07″W	Category B	49169	Upload Photo
14 Chapel Place, Creggs, Including Boundary Walls And Gatepiers				56°02′03″N 3°23′50″W	Category C(S)	49936	Upload Photo
8, 10, 12, 14 Church Street, Queen's Hotel				56°01′53″N 3°23′51″W	Category C(S)	49937	Upload Photo
Church Street, Inverkeithing Library				56°01′57″N 3°23′48″W	Category C(S)	49939	Upload Photo
King Street, Railway Bridge And 2 Associated Footbridges Along Line To South				56°01′54″N 3°23′40″W	Category C(S)	49952	Upload Photo
23, 25, 27 Townhall Street				56°01′52″N 3°23′48″W	Category C(S)	49957	Upload Photo
12, 14, 18 High Street, Providence House				56°01′50″N 3°23′51″W	Category B	35096	Upload Photo
North Queensferry, 25 Main Street, Albert Hotel				56°00′31″N 3°23′40″W	Category C(S)	9975	Upload another image
Hillend, 37, 39 Main Street, Hillend Tavern				56°02′27″N 3°22′23″W	Category C(S)	9983	Upload Photo
North Queensferry, Main Street, Pierhead House				56°00′30″N 3°23′41″W	Category C(S)	47553	Upload Photo
North Queensferry, 4, 6 Post Office Lane				56°00′34″N 3°23′38″W	Category C(S)	49179	Upload Photo
Boreland Road, Bridge Over Keithing Burn, Halbeath Waggon Way And Railway				56°02′02″N 3°23′42″W	Category B	49935	Upload another image See more images
Inverkeithing Harbour				56°01′42″N 3°23′42″W	Category B	49949	Upload Photo
35, 37 High Street, Royal Bank Of Scotland				56°01′51″N 3°23′54″W	Category C(S)	35101	Upload Photo
16, 18 Church Street, Fordell's Lodging				56°01′54″N 3°23′51″W	Category A	35103	Upload another image See more images
2 Hope Street, (Old Corn Exchange) Including Terrace				56°01′45″N 3°23′58″W	Category B	35110	Upload Photo
54 Hope Street (Old Parish Manse) Including Boundary Walls, Gatepiers And Garden Steps				56°01′36″N 3°24′08″W	Category C(S)	35111	Upload Photo
North Queensferry, Helen Place, Heron House				56°00′34″N 3°23′36″W	Category C(S)	9993	Upload Photo
Fordell Estate, Fordell Nursery, Walled Garden				56°03′14″N 3°22′32″W	Category B	49162	Upload Photo
North Queensferry, Chapel Place, Fourteen Falls Including Boundary Walls				56°00′33″N 3°23′37″W	Category C(S)	49168	Upload Photo
North Queensferry, Ferry Road, Ferrycraigs House				56°00′40″N 3°24′16″W	Category C(S)	49170	Upload Photo
North Queensferry, Main Street, Willie's Well				56°00′36″N 3°23′44″W	Category B	49175	Upload Photo
Hope Street, K6 Telephone Kiosk				56°01′34″N 3°24′10″W	Category B	49947	Upload Photo
Port Street, Vennel Wall				56°01′51″N 3°23′44″W	Category C(S)	49953	Upload Photo
Jamestown, Ferryhills Road, Naval Base Mansions				56°01′22″N 3°24′12″W	Category B	51009	Upload Photo
6, 8 High Street				56°01′52″N 3°23′51″W	Category C(S)	35095	Upload Photo
34, 36, 38, 40 High Street				56°01′49″N 3°23′52″W	Includes The Half Crown, Inverkeithing	35098	Upload Photo
79, 81 High Street, Including Wash House And Boundary Walls				56°01′48″N 3°23′57″W	Category B	35102	Upload Photo
9 King Street, Rosebery House, Including Well, Marriage Lintel To Back Garden, Boundary Walls And Gatepiers				56°01′53″N 3°23′45″W	Category B	35106	Upload Photo
North Queensferry, 18 Main Street, Ivy Cottage				56°00′33″N 3°23′40″W	Category C(S)	9976	Upload Photo
North Queensferry, 10, 14 Main Street, (Davidson's Buildings)				56°00′33″N 3°23′41″W	Category B	9985	Upload another image
North Queensferry, The Brae, Old School House				56°00′38″N 3°23′40″W	Category C(S)	9986	Upload Photo
North Queensferry, Helen Place, Helen Cottage				56°00′34″N 3°23′37″W	Category C(S)	9994	Upload Photo
Forth Road Bridge, Including Approach Ramps and Piers				56°00′06″N 3°24′15″W	Category A	49165	Upload another image See more images
North Queensferry, Carlingnose Submarine Mining Pier				56°00′47″N 3°23′13″W	Category B	49167	Upload Photo
North Queensferry, 17 Ferryhills Road, Ierne				56°00′52″N 3°23′37″W	Category C(S)	49172	Upload Photo
Roman Road, Town Wall				56°01′49″N 3°24′01″W	Category C(S)	49954	Upload Photo
Carlingnsoe Studios (Former Carlingnose Battery) Including Walls and Outbuildings				56°00′42″N 3°23′27″W	Category A	52012	Upload Photo

== Key ==
The scheme for classifying buildings in Scotland is:

- Category A: "buildings of national or international importance, either architectural or historic; or fine, little-altered examples of some particular period, style or building type."
- Category B: "buildings of regional or more than local importance; or major examples of some particular period, style or building type, which may have been altered."
- Category C: "buildings of local importance; lesser examples of any period, style, or building type, as originally constructed or moderately altered; and simple traditional buildings which group well with other listed buildings."

In March 2016 there were 47,288 listed buildings in Scotland. Of these, 8% were Category A, and 50% were Category B, with the remaining 42% being Category C.

== See also ==
- List of listed buildings in Fife
