= Marco Lo Muscio =

Italian organist, pianist and composer (born 1971)

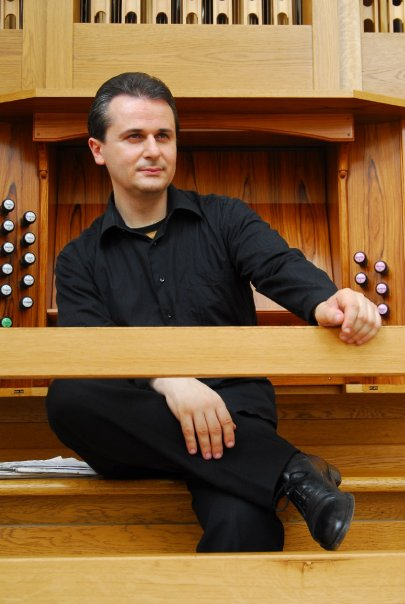
Marco Lo Muscio: Italian organist, pianist and composer

Marco Lo Muscio (born 1971) is an Italian organist, pianist and composer, who lives and works in Italy, Europe, Russian Federation and America.

== Biography ==
Marco Lo Muscio was born in Rome, Italy.

Marco Lo Muscio studied Piano at the Licinio Refice Conservatory in Italy. He earned a degree in Piano with Professor Tonino Maiorani and a degree in Musical Pedagogy with Professor Giulio Sforza at the Conservatorio Statale di Musica in Frosinone (Italy) and at the Roma Tre University (Italy).

He also obtained a degree of Advanced Studies in Piano at the Academy Bartolomeo Cristofori with the pianist Sergio Fiorentino, and a specialization in Pipe Organ with James Edward Goettsche.

Since 2004, he has been the art director of the International Organ Summer Festival in Rome, Italy, where internationally acclaimed organists and musicians performed such as Jean Guillou, Thomas Trotter, Stephen Tharp, Roger Sayer, Roger Fisher, Martin Baker, Pauli Pietiläinen, Aivars Kalējs, John Hackett, Pär Lindh, Jakob Lorentzen, Kevin Bowyer, David Briggs, Christopher Herrick, David Jackson, John Scott, Colin Walsh, Carson Cooman, Andrew Nethsingha, Martin Setchell, Alessandro Bianchi, Jean-Paul Imbert, Gail Archer.

Since 2008, Lo Muscio has been the Italian collaborator of John Hackett and Steve Hackett (Genesis).
The compositions and transcriptions of Marco Lo Muscio were broadcast on BBC, BR-Klassik, Vatican Radio, TV2000, RAI 3, and performed worldwide from renowned musicians such as Kevin Bowyer, Thomas Trotter, Roger Sayer, Carol Anne Williams, John Hackett, Christopher Herrick, Stephen Farr, David Briggs, John Scott, Patrick Ayrton, Andrea Padova, Chris Jarrett, Stephen Tharp.
Lo Muscio recorded CDs for the English classical label Priory Records, Stradivarius (record label) and Brilliant Classics.
Since 2019 he has been the creator of the "Wunderkammer Artificialia", a Wunderkammer Museum that allows the interaction between art and music (guided tour with concert).

== Works ==
Concerts as organist and pianist in Cathedrals and Concert Halls in Italy, Vatican, France (Notre-Dame de Paris), Milan Cathedral, Germany, England (St John's College, Cambridge, King's College, Cambridge, Merton College, Oxford, Keble College, Oxford, St Paul's Cathedral, Lincoln Cathedral, Ely Cathedral, Norwich Cathedral, Coventry Cathedral, Sheffield Cathedral, Canterbury Cathedral, The Queen's College, Oxford, Exeter College, Oxford, Gloucester Cathedral, Westminster Cathedral,Westminster Abbey, Lancaster Priory (with Steve Hackett), Temple Church, Truro Cathedral, St George's Chapel Windsor Castle, etc...) Scotland (University of Glasgow Memorial Chapel, Wales, New York, Chicago,- Washington D.C., Boston, Milwaukee, Spain, Lisbon Cathedral, Switzerland, Ukraine, Czech Republic, Poland, Lithuania, Latvia, Estonia, Denmark, Sweden (Uppsala Cathedral), Finland, Norway, Iceland, Russian Federation: Moscow International House of Music (2010),Saint Petersburg Philharmonia (Great Hall 2005, 2006, 2011), Saint Petersburg Court Capella (Glinka Capella),Gnessin State Musical Collegein Moscow,Cathedral of the Immaculate Conception in Moscow.

== Recordings ==
Recording Projects with English label Priory Records:

- “Great European Organs No.89: The Chichi Organ in The Basilica Del Sacro Cuore, Rome” (2013)

(Music by Jean Langlais, Marco Lo Muscio, Samuel Barber, Paolo Lazzeri, Keith Emerson, Keith Jarrett, Aaron Copland, Ralph Vaughan Williams).

- “Great European Organs No.94: The Schmid Organ of the Stadtpfarrkirche, Maria Himmelfahrt, Landsberg am Lech, Germany” (2015)

(Music by Anonymous [Germany], Andreas Kneller, Marco Lo Muscio, Johann Nikolaus Hanff, Johann Heinrich Buttstett, Johann Sebastian Bach, Arvo Pärt, Hugo Distler, Eduardo Torres, Andreas Willscher, Rick Wakeman, Steve Hackett).

- “Great European Organs No.96: The Matz and Luge Organ of St. Barnard's Church, Baden Baden, Germany” (2015)

(Music by Carl Orff, Marco Lo Muscio, Dietrich Buxtehude, Nikolaus Hasse, Johann Heinrich Buttstett, Johann Sebastian Bach, George Frideric Handel, James Edward Goettsche, Christian Heinrich Rinck, Andreas Willscher, Rick Wakeman).

- “The Organ Works of Marco Lo Muscio - Kevin Bowyer plays the Willis Organ of Glasgow University Memorial Chapel” (2017)

(Music by Marco Lo Muscio: Eowin's Memories, Trittico Toscano, Canzona "Homage to Gubbio", Vocalise No 5, Concert Variations on Greensleeves, In Memoriam Teodosia, Blue Prelude, Ostinato [Four Hands], Via Crucis [Stations of the Cross], New Litanies in memory of Jehan Alain).

- Appears On "Organ Party Vol.III" - Kevin Bowyer (2017) "In Memoriam of Messiaen"

Recording Projects with Stradivarius (record label) (2019):

- “On the Wings of the Wind" John Hackett and Marco Lo Muscio DUO

Featuring Steve Hackett, David Jackson and David Cross (musician).
(Music by Georg Philipp Telemann, Christoph Willibald Gluck, Maurice Ravel, György Ligeti, King Crimson, Genesis (band), Steve Hackett, John Hackett and Marco Lo Muscio.

Recording Projects with Brilliant Classics (2019):

- “Andrea Padova plays Lo Muscio" - Featuring Steve Hackett

(Music by Marco Lo Muscio and Steve Hackett).

With "Da Vinci Classics":
Appears On "Ferrari, Bacchini, Bertuletti, Macchia, Lo Muscio: Tabula Summa, Italian Contemporary Organ Music" - Ivan Ronda (2020)
"Prelude in memory of Maurice Ravel"; "Gothic Dances"

With "Appassionato label":
Appears On "Musica Viva - Today's Italian Organ Music" - Domenico Severin (2019)
"Homage to Edgar Allan Poe - The arrival of Red Death"

Recording Projects with English label Hacktrax Records:

- “Playing the History”: Fresh instrumental interpretations of some of the masterpieces of progressive rock music performed by Marco Lo Muscio, Steve Hackett, John Hackett, David Jackson, Carlo Matteucci and Giorgio Gabriel (2013)

Recording Projects with Finnish Magazine Colossus and French label Musea Records:

- “Rabid Dogs...Opening Themes” (2010)
- “Dante Alighieri: Paradise, Divine Comedy Book III” (2010)
- “Homer: Iliad - A Grand Piano Extravaganza” (2010)
- “Tales of Edgar Allan Poe” (2010)
- “A Flower Full of Stars" - a Tribute to The Flower Kings.(2011)
- “Giovanni Boccaccio: The Decameron Part I” (2012)
- “Giovanni Boccaccio: The Decameron Part II” (2014) - with "Playing the History"

Recording Projects with Italian labels Drycastle Records and Erreffe Edizioni Musicali distributed from BTF (Italian distribution) and Camino Records:

- "Marco Lo Muscio Plays Marco Lo Muscio" (2007)
- "New Horizons: The Music of Steve Hackett" (2008)
- "Dark and Light": Progressive originals and transcriptions (2009)
- "The Book of Bilbo and Gandalf" (2010) with Steve Hackett, John Hackett and Pär Lindh
- "The Mystic and Progressive Music" (2011)

Video:

- "Dusk Day 4: Welcome Steve! A day in Orvieto (with Steve Hackett and John Hackett) (BTF AMS 104 DVD 2009)
- "The Mystic and Esoteric Organ" (DVD 2009)

Recording Projects with Italian label Studio Amadeus:

- Piano Visions (1999)
  (Music by Fauré, Liszt, Jehan Alain, Messiaen)
- Organ Visions (2000)
  (Music by Bach, Jean Langlais, Guillaume de Machaut, Arvo Pärt, John Dowland, Thomas Tallis, Orlando Gibbons, Vaughan Williams)
- Organ Vision II (2002)
  (Music by Richard Strauss, Martin Steel, Herbert Howells, Bjarne Sløgedal, Derek Bourgeois, Erik Satie, Charles Tournemire, Simon Preston, John Weaver, Henry Purcell, Henry VIII, William Walton)
- American Piano Music (2001)
  (Music by Lo Muscio, Chick Corea, Brad Mehldau, Keith Jarrett, Keith Emerson, Lennie Tristano, George Gershwin, Steve Hackett, Tony Banks)
- Louis Spohr, Robert Schumann and Franz Schubert: Chamber Music (2001) with Amelia Versiglioni (soprano) and Simone Scarcella (clarinet).

=== Compositions ===
Works for Pipe Organ

2007:

- Ecstatic Meditations (Homage to Messiaen) – Homage to Satie – Homage to Keith Jarrett – Homage to Keith Emerson)
- Blue Prelude
- Toccata on the name AGBA "Angel's Dance"
- Welsh Fantasy
- Organ Visions ("Gothic Visions from Perotinus Time" – "Celestial Visions from Beyond – Gandalf's Dream")

2008:

- Mystic Pieces - n.1 "The Mystic Bourdon – n.2 "Mystic Alleluya in memory of Messiaen" – n.3 "Cantus Mysticus pro Arvo Pärt" – n.4 "Mystic Dance of Fire – To Robert Fripp") (Performed during the "Annual Festival of the New Organ Music" in London)
- New Litanies in memory of Jehan Alain
- Choral and Prog Dance – "To Keith Emerson"

2009:

- Paradiso: Epilogue: "Towards the Stars" from "The Divine Comedy"
- Towards Rivendell – Gandalf's Meditation (Commissioned from Alessandro Bianchi)

2010:

- Visions from Minas Tirith – The White Tree (Poem for Organ)
- Homage to Edgar Allan Poe – "The arrival of Red Death"
- Concert Variations on Greensleeves (Commissioned from Christopher Herrick) (Performed during the "Annual Festival of the New Organ Music"in London)

2011:

- Red Pedal Solo
- White Prelude – Homage to Giovanni Boccaccio
- Basilicas and Churches in Rome (Poem for Organ) (Commissioned from Michael Eckerle)
- Visions from Rohan – The Golden Town (Poem for Organ)
- In Memoriam of Messiaen (Ecstatic Meditation & Mystic Alleluja)

2012:

- Vocalise n.1 "To my mother" (Performed during the "Annual Festival of the New Organ Music"in London)

- Pan - to Giulio Sforza (Fantasy)
- Variations on Gabriel's Message

2013:

- Prelude in memory of Maurice Ravel
- Prelude "To Lúthien" (Vocalise n.2)
- Vocalise n.3 "Pour Dauphine"

2014:

- Via Crucis (Stations of the Cross)

2015:

- Canzona "Homage to Todi"
- Canzona "Homage to Gubbio"
- Trittico Toscano "Homage to Pienza":
- I.Ricercare "Pienza Cathedral"
- II.Canone sul nome P.I.E.N.Z.A.
- III.Saltarello "Piccolomini Palace"
- Vocalise n.4 "Invocation to Francesco d'Assisi"
- Vocalise n.5 "To Nadja"

- Il Cammino di Francesco (The way of Francis of Assisi)
- Pastorale "Francesco a Greccio"
- Éowyn's Memories
- The Dream of Arwen
- In memoriam

- Ostinato (Four hands)

2016:

- Vocalise n.6 "To Carson" (Commissioned by Carson Cooman - Harvard University)
- Three Ostinato Preludes: (Commissioned by Carson Cooman - Harvard University)
- I Mystic Litanies
- II Medieval Prelude
- III In the Progressive Mood
- An Endless Song
- "Homage to Orvieto":
- I Fantasia (Homage to Landino) "Palazzo del Popolo"
- II Ricercare Cromatico "Orvieto Cathedral"
- III Pavana "Church of San Giovenale"
- IV Canzona "Church of Sant'Agostino"

2017:

- In Memoriam Keith Emerson "Ostinato"
- Gothic Dances: (Commissioned by Carson Cooman - Harvard University)
- I Contraddanza - "The Knights of Piero della Francesca"
- II Estampie - "Homage to Charlemagne"
- III Pavana - "Hunters in the snow" by Pieter Bruegel
- IV Tourdion - "Dance Macabre" by Bernt Nokte in Tallinn
- V Saltarello - "Peasant wedding" by Pieter Bruegel
- VI Canzona Gotica "The Cathedral of San Biagio in Montepulciano"
- Quattro Fioretti di San Francesco (Four Little Flowers of Francis of Assisi):(Commissioned by Carson Cooman - Harvard University)
- I. "Il pranzo mistico di Santa Chiara e San Francesco"(Fioretto XV)
- II. "San Francesco addomestica le tortore selvagge" (Fioretto XXII)
- III. "Cristo appare a Giovanni della Verna" (Fioretto XLIX)
- IV. "San Francesco converte il lupo di Gubbio” (Fioretto XXI)
- Gothic Canon, Mystic Vocalise and Organum for Adelio
- Meditation on “Ein Feste Burge”
- White Prelude n.2 “Homage to Geoffrey Chaucer”(Commissioned by Carson Cooman - Harvard University)
- "Ad Lucem"
- Variations on Scarborough Fair (ballad)

2018:

- Four Seasonal Rhapsodies (Commissioned by Carson Cooman - Harvard University)
- Fantasia on Wondrous Love (Commissioned by Carson Cooman - Harvard University)
- Fantasia Meditation on Lauda Sion

2019:

- Dyptique Magique:

I. Ostinato sur le nom M.E.R.L.I.N.
II. Ricercare on the name G.A.N.D.A.L.F.

- Three Ostinato Meditations (Commissioned by Carson Cooman - Harvard University):

I. On the name T.A.L.L.I.S.
II. On the name A.S.T.O.N.
III. On the name H.A.C.K.E.T.T.

- "Mosaics", Homage to Ravenna:

I. Ricercare “La Basilica di San Vitale”
II. Processione dei Magi
III. Tordion - Il Leone di San Marco
IV. Abramo e gli angeli
V. Cervi Sacri

2020:

- Ricercare and Ostinato on the name C.O.O.M.A.N.
- “Jonah and the whale” - Biblical Scene
- “DARK TIMES” (Commissioned by Carson Cooman - Harvard University):

I. Medieval Times
II. Black Plague
III. Prayer

- "Hymn Suite" (Commissioned by Carson Cooman - Harvard University):

1. Prelude on “There's a Wideness in God's Mercy”
2. Offertory (Cantilena) on “Love Divine, All Loves Excelling”
3. Interlude on “All Hail the Power of Jesus' Name”
4. Meditation on “Amazing Grace”
5. Elevation on “Nearer, My God, to Thee”
6. Postlude on “Holy God, We Praise Thy Name”

- "Shakespeare Suite":

I. Processional from “Richard III”
II. Soliloquy from “Hamlet”
III. Puck from “Midsummer Night's Dream”

2022:

- Meditation on the "Punta Scorno" Lighthouse

Works for Piano

2007:

- Blue Prelude
- Night Song – To Bill Evans

2008:

- Gymnopédie n.0 –To Erik Satie
- Dark and Light – "The Book of Gandalf" (Poem for Piano)

2009:

- Meditation on "Horizons" – To Steve Hackett
- Blue Ostinato – To Keith Jarrett
- Paradise: Prologue (Poem for Piano) from "The Divine Comedy"
- Medieval Melodies (n.1 "Theoden's Meditation" – n.2 "The Knight of Rohan")

- Galadriel – Elf Song
- The Hobbit Book – Bilbo and Gandalf (Poem for Piano)

2010:

- Iliad: Book III and Book XVI (from Homer)

2011:

- The Lament for Gandalf (Poem for Piano)

2013:

- "Nastagio degli Onesti" (Day 5 – Tale 8) from "The Decameron" by Giovanni Boccaccio

2015:

- Prelude and Gymnopédie
- Due Ricercari (Piano version)

2017:

- Prelude in Memory of Claude Debussy - "La Lune Blanche"

2018:

- "Courtly Love" (Amor cortese)
- The Journey of Gandalf (Homage to J. R. R. Tolkien)
- The Book of a Vampire (Homage to Bram Stoker)

- In Memoriam (Piano version)

2019:

- The Yellow King (Homage to Robert W. Chambers)
- The Gothic Room from "Gaspard de la Nuit (poetry collection)"(Homage to Aloysius Bertrand)
- Canone and Ostinato
- Prelude and Ostinato
- Contrappunti (Contrapunctus)
- Prelude and Gymnopèdie

2022:

- "Miracoli/Miracles" - Incidental music for Roberto Leoni's theatrical show:

Prelude Atto I - Prelude Atto II - Marcia Atto III - Alleuja 1,2,3

Works for Harpsichord 2018:

- Trois Pièces pour Clavecin (Prèmiere Ricercare – Prélude Ostinato – Deuxième Ricercare)

Chamber Music

2011/19:

- Bilbo's Dream (dedicated to John Hackett) - Solo Flute
- Gymnopédie n.0 (To Erik Satie)
- Six Vocalises (Soprano or Flute/Saxophone/Violin and organ/piano)
- Prelude in memory of Maurice Ravel (for Flute/Saxophone and organ)
- Nastagio degli Onesti (from The Decameron)
- "Courtly Love" (Amor cortese) flute and Piano version
