= Christopher Bowers-Broadbent =

English organist

Christopher Bowers-Broadbent (born 13 January 1945) is an English organist and composer.

== Biography ==
Christopher Bowers-Broadbent was born in Hertfordshire UK on 13 January 1945. He was a boy chorister in the Choir of King's College, Cambridge under Boris Ord and then briefly under David Willcocks. While at King's, he played violin and piano. During his teenage years he was a pupil at Berkhamsted School where he first began to learn the organ under Dr Kenneth Abbott.

After Berkhamsted School Bowers-Broadbent went on to study at the Royal Academy of Music where his principal studies were organ with Arnold Richardson (organist of the West London Synagogue and Wolverhampton Town Hall), and composition with Richard Rodney Bennett.

=== Composing career ===
Over more than 60 years he has composed a wide range of works, including : four operas (The Pied Piper of Hamelin, with children, 1972; The Seacock Bane, for teenagers, 1978; The Last Man, comic, 2003; The Face, a crime thriller, 2012): choral music (Shabbat Evening and Morning Service, in Hebrew, 2021' Te Deum, 2023/5; Benedictus, 2025; Jubilate, 2025) and organ music (Duets and Canons,1996; Media vita, 1996; 7 Words, 2002).

=== Concert organist career ===
He made his debut at the Camden Festival in 1966; his first major recitals were at the St Albans International Organ Festival in 1969 and the Royal Festival Hall in 1971. His first appearance as a soloist was at the Proms in 1972. He has worked extensively with Paul Hillier's Theatre of Voices.

=== Dedications and honours ===
- ? - Fellow of the Royal Academy of Music (FRAM).
- c.2020. Honorary Master of the Bench ot the Honourable Society of Gray's Inn.
- .2025. Arvo Pärt's Puzzle was written for him in celebration of his birthday.

=== Liturgical organist career ===
- ? - All Saints, Berkhamsted .
- ? - St Pancras, Euston, London.
- c.1970 -2021 West London Synagogue, and Director of Music from 2012.
- 1983 - Honourable Society of Gray's Inn, London

=== Recording career ===
His extensive discography includes many ECM (Edition of Contemporary Music) albums, reflecting a long-running and fruitful partnership with the Hilliard Ensemble and Estonian composer Arvo Pärt. He recorded CDs as an organist and has also appeared with Paul Hillier's Theatre of Voices.

=== Teaching career: organ ===
- 1973-1992. An organ professor at the Royal Academy of Music.

==== Pupils: organ ====
- Kevin Bowyer.
- Andrew Pink (RAM post-graduate student 1980-81).

Christopher Bowers-Broadbent is the father of musician Harry Broadbent.

== Compositions ==
=== Choral ===
- 1968 Four Lovescapes, canticles (E. E. Cummings)
- 1972 Worthy is the Lamb, cantata
- 1974 The Hollow Man (T. S. Eliot)
- 1975 Rhymes without Reason, four songs (Mervyn Peake)
- 1976 The Story of Cars, a short cantata
- 1978 Deo Gratias, a motet
- 1981 The Quarry, a short cantata (W. H. Auden)
- 1989 Jubilate-Cantate
- 1999 Holy Communion service for Gray's Inn

==== Canticles ====
===== Evening canticles =====
- 1968 Festal setting
- 1968 Lenten setting
- 1976 in Two Parts
- 1988 Ex-St Pancras

===== Morning canticles =====
- 1972 Te Deum (ICET text)
- 1975 Te Deum
- 1971 Short communion service
- 1973 Communion Service (Series III text)
- 1981 A New Benedicite (Leonard Clark)

==== Anthems ====
- 1965 2 Short Motets
- 1966 Brief life
- 1968 No time ago
- 1968 Offer your very selves
- 1968 Into this world of sorrow
- 1969 Virgin Born
- 1969 Music to Hear
- 1969 Pleasure it is
- 1969 The way to Life
- 1970 Pater noster
- 1970 Except the Lord
- 1970 Let thy merciful ears
- 1971 I thank you God
- 1976 The grace of God
- 1977 There is water in the river
- 1995 Yiheyu leratson
- 1994 The Elixir
- 1994 Hail bright Cecilia
- 1996 Since I
- 1997 Hashivenu
- 1997 Office Hymns
- 1997 All praise
- 1997 Az Yashir Mosheh (Song of Moses)

==== Christmas music ====
- 1963/1970 Sleep Holy Babe
- 1965 Matin Responsory
- 1971 A spotless rose
- 1973 There is no rose
- 1977 If Christ were born in Camden (A. F. Bayly)
- 1978 If Christ were born in London
- 1984 A Christmas Litany (Fred Kaan)
- 1985 A Christmas Song (Laurence Housman)
- 1991 Angelus ad Virginem
- 1999 As with gladness
- 2002 Alleluia: A new work is come on hand

=== Instrumental ===
- 1966 Dialogue and Controversy for brass and organ
- 1967 Serenatas for oboe
- 1967 Dogmas for brass quartet and timpani
- 1968 Duo for flute and violin
- 1970 3 Duets for flute
- 1970 Fantasia for lute
- 1975 Little Concerto for oboe and string orchestra
- 1979 Piece for E-flat clarinet
- 2000 A Ship bound for Tarshish for chamber orchestra
- 2001 The Song at the Sea for organ, strings and timpani

==== Organ ====
- 1964 Variations
- 1966 Four Diversions
- 1968 Six Pieces
- 1968 Serenata
- 1994 PreluDDe
- 1996 Media vita – a sequence of short pieces
- 1996 Duets and canons – a sequence of short pieces (recorded by Kevin Bowyer)
- 1997 Ya Shema
- 2000 Organ Notebook 1
- 2002 7 Words – a piece in 7 movements

=== Chamber operas ===
- 1972 The Pied Piper (a children's opera) – libretto by Jeremy Hornsby
- 1979 The Seacock Bane (for teenagers) – libretto by Tony Vincent Isaacs
- 1982 The Last Man (a comic opera) – libretto by Tony Vincent Isaacs

==== Songs and incidental music ====
- 1969 The Becauseway a play by Wesley Burrowes
- 1971 And All The People Rejoiced a play by Wesley Burrowes
- 1982 The Three Brothers a story for shadow puppets by Jessica Souhami

== Selected recordings ==
=== As composer ===
- 1999: Duets and Canons, perf. Kevin Bowyer (Hong Kong : Naxos Music Library).

=== As performer ===
- 1986: The organ music of Robert Schumann (Leighton Buzzard : Priory Records)
- 1987: 'An den Wassern zu Babel' / 'Pari intervallo' / 'De profundis' by Arvo Pärt. with various (Munich : ECM)
- 1990: 'Amazaing Grace', with Jessye Norman, et al. (New York : Decca)
- 1992: 'Trivium', works by Arvo Pärt] / Peter Maxwell Davies and Philip Glass (Munich : ECM)
- 1993: 'Górecki, Satie, Milhaud: O Domina Nostra' with Sarah Leonard (Munich : ECM)
- 1995: 'Méditations sur le mystère de la Sainte Trinité' by Olivier Messiaen (Munich : ECM)
- 1997: 'Behold a pale horse' by Stephen Montague, with Orchestra of St. John's, Smith Square (London : ASV)
- 1997: 'Beatus' works by Arvo Pärt with Estonian Philharmonic Chamber Choir (Naxos Music Library)
- 2003: 'Triodon' works by Arvo Pärt with Polyphony (London : Hyperion)
- 2005: 'Berliner Mass' by Arvo Pärt., with Theatre of Voices (Burbank, Calif. : Harmonia Mundi)
- 2008: 'Another look at harmony. Part IV' by Philip Glass, with Choir of the 21st Century (Thames Ditton : SOMM Recordings)
- 2013: 'Monastic Chant', with Theatre of Voices (Arles : Harmonia Mundi )
- 2014: 'Kiddush' by Kurt Weill with BBC Singers (Brentwood, Tennessee : Milken Archive Digital)
- 2015: 'Notker' by Pablo Ortiz with Ars Nova Copenhagen (Corfe Castle : Orchid Classics)
- 2017: 'Walking Song' by Kevin Volans with Ars Nova Copenhagen (Brooklyn, NY : Cantaloupe Music)
