= Thierry Pallesco =

French organist and composer (born 1956)

- Born: 1956 (age 68–69); Paris, France
- Genres: Classical
- Occupation(s): Organist, composer
- Instrument: Organ

Thierry Pallesco is a French organist and composer who was born in Paris in 1956.

== Life ==
He studied the organ with André Isoir, then with Rolande Falcinelli at the Conservatoire National Supérieur de Musique in Paris where he was awarded three first prizes in harmony, counterpoint and fugue (1980–1982), then his prize in organ (1983). His organ works have been published in France and Germany.

For many reasons (health problems with two of his children, family life), Pallesco gave few organ recitals. So, many organists have agreed to include among its "ambassadors" around the world.

== Organ works ==
Pallesco uses a personal musical language, often atonal (“Christ a vaincu la mort”, the first 3 “Caprices poétiques”,…), sometimes bitonal ("Harmonies en Paradis") or even modal (the "Fugue" of the "Toccata et Fugue en Ut#"). His music, though it is very original, is also certainly inspired by the compositions of the three great "D" of the French contemporary organ music: Marcel Dupré, Maurice Duruflé and Jeanne Demessieux. Many pieces require a great virtuosity (the "Toccata en Ut#" is the best example). Among the most played works include: “Le salut messianique”, "Christ a vaincu la mort", “Rhapsodie”, and the very dreaded "Toccata et fugue en Ut#" (only recorded by Kevin Bowyer to date).

== Discography ==
- "The Organ Works of Thierry Pallesco" (Priory records, UK, 2014): 13 organ pieces by Kevin Bowyer (organ of Glasgow Cathedral).
- "Sing to the Lord" (Convivium records, UK, 2009), the Choirs of Portsmouth Cathedral, where Le Salut Messianique of T. Pallesco has been recorded by Marcus Wibberley.
