= Pär Lindh =

Swedish musician (born 1959)

- Born: Pär Olov Aron Lind; March 24, 1959 (age 66)
- Origin: Sweden
- Genres: Symphonic rock
- Occupation: Musician
- Instruments: Organ, piano, and more
- Years active: 1977–present
- Labels: Crimsonic
- Members: Pär Lindh, Jocke Ramsell, Magdalena Hagberg, Nisse Bielfeld, Marcus Jäderholm
- Website: http://www.parlindh.com/

Pär Olov Aron Lind (born 24 March 1959), known professionally as Pär Lindh, is a Swedish composer, musician and founding member of the Swedish symphonic rock group Pär Lindh Project.

Before working in a band, Lindh had several careers. These included church organist, touring classical pianist, solo harpsichordist, drummer, Hammond organist, and jazz and ragtime entertainer. During 1977 and 1978, Lindh played in hard rock bands such as Antenna Baroque and Vincebus Eruptum. However, he decided to leave the rock scene in 1979 to become a classical player in France. In 1989, Lindh returned to Sweden to pursue his interest in progressive rock.

== 1991–1994 ==
In 1991, Lindh and several friends founded The Swedish Art Rock Society. The society's purpose was to start a festival that would serve as a starting point for the current wave of progressive and art rock. During this period, Lindh (alongside Jocke Ramsell and the late Magdalena Hagberg), made his first record with the Crimsonic Label, Gothic Impressions.

== 1995–1999 ==
Lindh continued working with Ramsell and Hagberg, and together with Nisse Bielfeld and Marcus Jäderholm, they formed Pär Lindh Project. In 1996 the concept album Bilbo was released, inspired by J. R. R. Tolkien's first book The Hobbit. PLP headlined the 1997 Rio Art Rock Festival and played other dates in Brazil and Argentina. Late 1997 saw the release of Mundus Incompertus.

== 2000–present ==
PLP are always received well on tour, and have won several prizes for "Best band of festival".^{1} After the summer 2000 tour PLP continued as the trio Magdalena, Nisse and Pär to record PLP's third album Veni Vidi Vici. In 2002 the band suffered a setback due to illness. However, they did a strong return in 2004, and started recording a new album. In 2009, Lindh wanted to start a new band with some teenagers from the area. The band's name became The Willburgers. In 2011 his album with PLP, Time Mirror, was recorded.

== Discography ==
=== Pär Lindh Project ===
- Gothic Impressions (1994)
- Rondo (1996)
- Mundus Incompertus (1997)
- Veni Vidi Vici (2001)
- Time Mirror (2011)
- Nagelfar (2025)

=== Live Album ===
- Live in America (1999)
- Live in Iceland (2002)

=== Pär Lindh and Björn Johansson ===
- Bilbo (1996)
- Dreamsongs from the Middle Earth (2004)

=== With others ===
- The Book of Bilbo and Gandalf (2010) with Steve Hackett, John Hackett & Marco Lo Muscio

=== Video ===
- Live in Poland (2008)
