= Lion and Unicorn Staircase =

Staircase at the University of Glasgow

Coordinates: 55.8714°N 4.2899°W

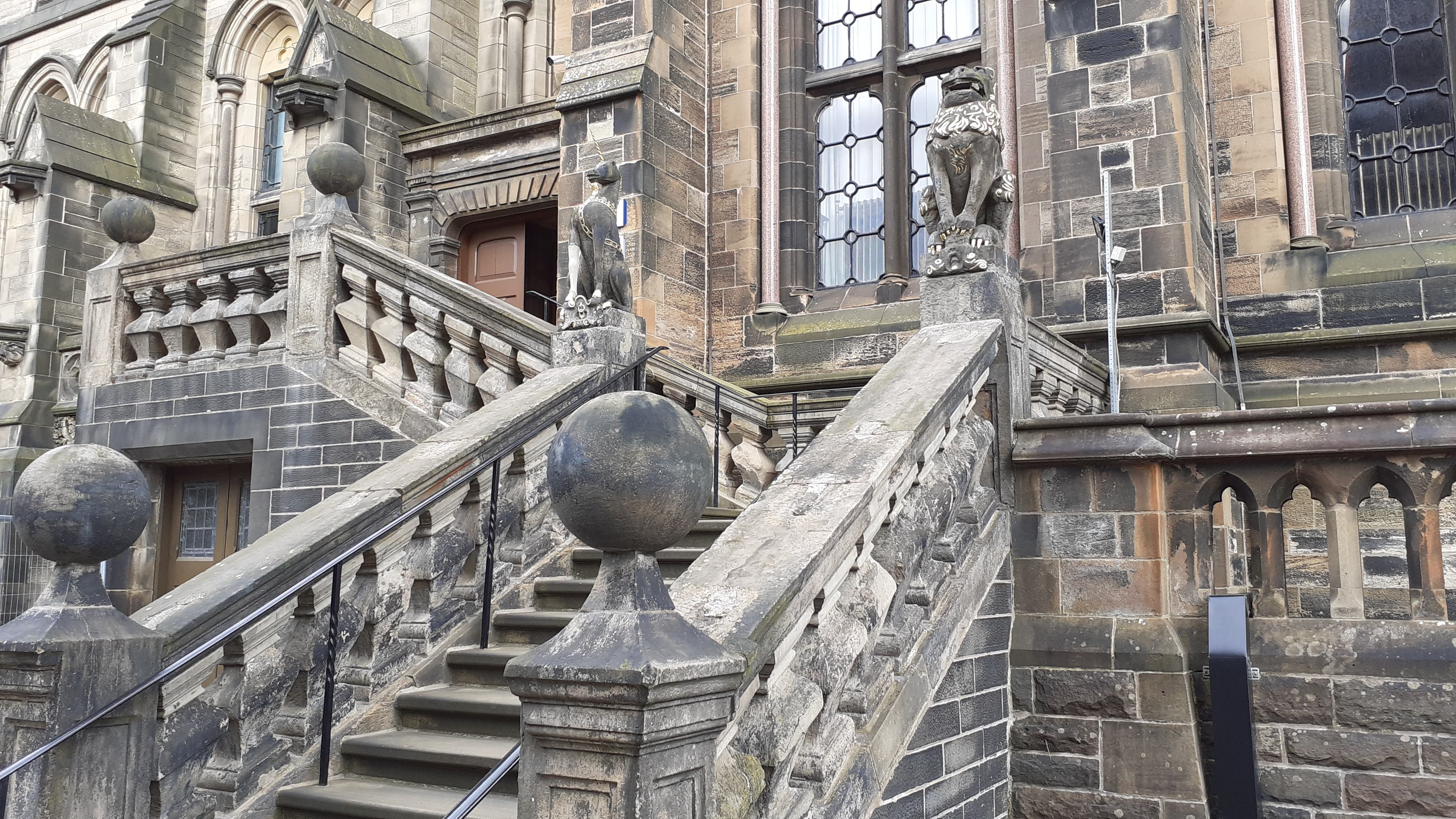
Lion and Unicorn Staircase

The Lion and Unicorn Staircase, at the University of Glasgow, is located next to the university's Memorial Chapel on the west side of the Main Building. It consists of two flights connected by a landing, the upper flight turning ninety degrees to the left from the lower flight. There is a balustrade adorned with sculptures of a unicorn on the left and a lion on the right. Along with the Memorial Chapel and the adjacent Gilbert Scott Building, it is protected as a Category A listed building.

The staircase originally formed part of the university's Old College site on High Street, situated in the Outer Court and leading to the Principal's Residence and the Fore Hall. On 20 June 1690, the university instructed William Riddel, a mason, to place stone bannisters on the staircase with figures of a lion and a unicorn on the first turn, for which he was paid twelve pounds sterling. Work began on 30 June and finished on 15 August that year.

When the university moved to its new site in Gilmorehill in 1870, the staircase was transported and incorporated into the new building, along with parts of the High Street gatehouse, which were rebuilt as Pearce Lodge. When the Main Building of the university was originally built, the West Quadrangle was not enclosed on all sides; instead, on the west side, a staircase stood at each end of a small landscaped garden leading from the elevated grass of the quadrangle to the lower level of The Square, where the Principal's and Professors' houses were. The Lion and Unicorn Staircase was the southern of these.

The quadrangle was subsequently enclosed when the new Memorial Chapel and additional facilities were built along that side between 1914 and 1929, and the Lion and Unicorn Staircase provided access to these from The Square. When first installed in Gilmorehill, the staircase turned right at its middle landing (as it did in its original site), but was altered at this time to turn left. At its original site in the Old College, the staircase had led to the Fore Hall; amongst the new rooms created with the 1929 Gilmorehill expansion was a new hall, also named the Fore Hall.
