= James Lancelot =

- Born: 2 December 1952 (age 73)
- Genres: Choral music
- Occupations: Organist, Choral Conductor
- Instrument: Organ

James Bennett Lancelot (born 2 December 1952) was master of the Choristers, and cathedral organist at Durham Cathedral from 1985. He retired in 2017 and was appointed canon organist emeritus by the bishop of Durham.

Lancelot was educated at St Paul's Cathedral School and Ardingly College. At 16 he was the youngest of his generation to attain the Fellowship of the Royal College of Organists (FRCO). He went up to King's College, Cambridge, where he was organ scholar from 1971 to 1974. Lancelot spent the next ten years as sub-organist of Winchester Cathedral prior to his move to Durham.

Lancelot's time at Durham Cathedral was a period of expansion: in 1997 he founded Durham Cathedral Consort of Singers, a cathedral voluntary choir made up of singers from the town and the university. The consort quickly gained a reputation as one of the leading chamber choirs in the region. The cathedral choir itself was expanded with the introduction of girl choristers, in addition to the boys. The girl and boy choristers usually sing separately, but have an equal workload and parity of status.

The commissioning of new music was a feature of James Lancelot's tenure. Notable works include John Tavener's Ikon of St Cuthbert, James MacMillan's Missa Dunelmi and several important pieces by John Casken.

He has been a member of the Royal College of Organists Council since 1988, and most recently of its Executive and Library Committees. He also conducted for the Durham University Choral Society during his tenure at Durham Cathedral.

In 2008 he was appointed a Fellow of the Royal School of Church Music.

In 2013 he was appointed president of the Incorporated Association of Organists.

He has released several acclaimed recordings, including a DVD of Elgar's Organ Sonata and a CD of J.S. Bach's Orgelbüchlein.

He has acted as interim organist and director of music at Worcester Cathedral, and is currently acting organist at New College, Oxford for the duration of Hilary Term 2020.

In his spare time, James Lancelot is a steam railway enthusiast.

== Honours ==
In 2014 Lancelot was awarded an honorary doctoral degree from the University of Durham.

In 2016, the Archbishop of Canterbury awarded him the Cranmer Award for Worship "for his contribution to cathedral worship through excellence in the practice of music within the liturgy".

Cultural offices
Preceded by Richard Lloyd	Master of the Choristers and Organist Durham Cathedral; 1985–2017	Succeeded by Daniel Cook
