= Kevin Bowyer =

English organist (born 1961)

- Born: 9 January 1961; Southend-on-Sea, England
- Education: Royal Academy of Music
- Occupation: Organist

Kevin John Bowyer (/ˈboʊjər/; born 9 January 1961) is an English organist, known for his prolific recording and recital career and his performances of modern and extremely difficult compositions.

== Biography ==
Bowyer was born on 9 January 1961 in Southend-on-Sea, England. He sang in a choir and learnt the piano accordion and organ as a child. When the church where he practised refused to let him carry on practising, he says: "I went and had a key cut to the church and I got in anyway." He attended Cecil Jones High School in Southend, and studied at the Royal Academy of Music from 1979 to 1982 with organists Christopher Bowers-Broadbent and Douglas Hawkridge, harpsichordist Virginia Black, and Paul Steinitz. After graduation, he studied for two years with David Sanger after winning a Countess of Munster Musical Trust scholarship. When given a list of music to prepare at his first meeting with Sanger, he did not realise that it was a term's work and had learnt it all by the next week.

Aside from playing the organ, he reads modernist literature, especially James Joyce, Samuel Beckett and the Powys family.

== Repertoire and performances ==
While a student, he performed the complete organ symphonies of Charles-Marie Widor, Louis Vierne and Marcel Dupré (none of which he has yet recorded), and the complete organ music of Olivier Messiaen. He was able to do this because, he says, "When I was 21, I developed a technique that allowed me to learn a French organ symphony every month" and "always started at the end and then worked backwards." His debut recital was at the Royal Festival Hall in 1984.

He has won the following competitions:

- St Albans International Organ Festival 1983 (neither 2nd nor 3rd prize was awarded that year)
- Odense International Organ Competition 1990
- Paisley International Organ Festival 1990
- Dublin International Organ and Choral Festival 1990
- Calgary International Organ Festival 1990

He has performed and broadcast all over the world, and has released around ninety recordings, including all of Bach's organ music for the Nimbus recording label. His recital repertoire is enormous and ever expanding; in an article restricted to European 20th-century classical music for the organ, he mentions over 100 composers whose music he has played. Though he sees contemporary music as his vocation, he plays organ music from the Renaissance and Baroque periods onwards, and has shown an appreciation for the qualities of historical instruments in such music.

He is the first of two people to have played and recorded Kaikhosru Sorabji's First Organ Symphony in its entirety, and the only person to have performed Sorabji's Second Organ Symphony in its entirety.

Kaikhosru Shapurji Sorabji: Organ Symphony No. 1
Opening of the first movement, Prelude, played by Kevin Bowyer on the Harrison & Harrison organ of St. Mary Redcliffe, Bristol

That it [Sorabji's First Organ Symphony] is finally becoming known, more than sixty years later [than it was published, in 1925], is due entirely to the uniquely enterprising spirit, astounding prowess and unending and unbending patience and dedication of the most outstanding organist of his generation, who, in his continuing work in preparing for performance and recording Sorabji's Second and Third Organ Symphonies (which of necessity includes fair-copying them longhand), is singlehandedly rewriting the history of organ music since Liszt.

— Alistair Hinton, 1988

He was organist of the Parish of Warwick from 1989 until 1998; during this time, he taught around the country for the St Giles International Organ School. In 2005 he was appointed university organist at the University of Glasgow (with access to the Harrison & Harrison/Willis organ in the University Memorial Chapel), while continuing his teaching career at the Royal Northern College of Music in Manchester and the Royal Scottish Academy of Music and Drama in Glasgow. New projects include the annual Glasgow International Organ Festival and Glasgow Pipeworks series of recitals of new music for organ.

On learning music, he says: "I practise bits and pieces of it over and over again until my fingers are moving faster than my brain, then I home in on what is difficult and link these with the easier passages, but the easier passages are still no less learned than the difficult ones. Sometimes it's necessary to practise for twelve to fourteen hours a day, during which you need to keep your mind alert." A particular example has been when he had to learn Niccolo Castiglioni's Sinfonia Guerriere et Amorose, 41 minutes of "nearly unplayable music. [...] I set my mind to encompass it in an eight-day learning period, a frame-work the piece naturally slipped into."

Since 2008 he has been able, with the support of the Glasgow University Trust, to be engaged almost exclusively in preparing for performances of Sorabji's three organ symphonies, the difficulties of which he describes thus:

In my career as a player of contemporary organ music I've played most of the notorious, "super-difficult" pieces—Iannis Xenakis' Gmeeoorh, Brian Ferneyhough's Sieben Sterne, Niccolò Castiglioni's Sinfonie Guerriere et Amorose, etc. Sorabji's First Organ Symphony makes all those pieces look like grade 2 finger exercises. And Organ Symphony 2 makes Organ Symphony 1 look like—a grade 2 finger exercise.

— Kevin Bowyer

The lengths are also considerable: the Second Symphony alone is over an hour longer than Messiaen's complete organ music put together. The Second Symphony was premiered in 2010 and there were several postponements due to the difficulty of learning it. The Third Organ Symphony is expected to be premiered in 2022. Bowyer has also produced new typeset editions of Sorabji's three organ symphonies.

== Recordings ==
- J. S. Bach: Complete organ works – 29 CDs (17 volumes)
- Jehan Alain: Complete organ works
- Johannes Brahms: Complete organ works
- Charles-Valentin Alkan – Complete organ and pedal piano works
- Thierry Pallesco: Organ works (Organ of Glasgow Cathedral, Priory Records)
- Jean Langlais: Organ works
- Robert Schumann and Julius Reubke: Organ works
- Paul Hindemith, Arnold Schoenberg, and Ernst Pepping: Organ works
- Olivier Messiaen: Organ works
- Kaikhosru Shapurji Sorabji: Organ Symphony No. 1
- Charles Camilleri: Organ works
- Alan Gibbs: Magic Flutes: Organ music
- Peter Maxwell Davies, Jonathan Harvey, and Malcolm Williamson: Organ music
- Philip Glass and Christopher Bowers-Broadbent: Organ works
- Brian Ferneyhough, Wilfrid Mellers, and John Tavener: Mandelion: Organ music
- Paul Fisher: Organ music
- Arvo Pärt, Sofia Gubaidulina, Einojuhani Rautavaara, and Henryk Mikolaj Górecki: Organ music
- Niels Gade, Franz Syberg, Per Nørgård, and Carl Nielsen: Danish Organ Music
- A Late Twentieth century Edwardian Bach Recital
- In Memoriam John Ogdon
- Twentieth Century English Music
- Christmas Organ Music
- For Weddings
- A Feast of Organ Exuberance
- In Praise of Father Willis – the Alcock legacy
- Organ Xplosion 1
- Dambusters! Organ Xplosion 2
- The Storm
- Five English Abbeys
- Organ Party Vol.I ( Priory Records)
- Organ Party Vol.II (Priory Records)
- Organ Party Vol.III (Priory Records)
- The Organ Works of Marco Lo Muscio (Priory Records)
- Olivier Messiaen - Works for Organ (Priory Records)
- Green and Pleasant Land (Priory Records)

== Writings ==
- Kevin Bowyer: 20th Century European Organ Music: A Toast, in The IAO Millennium Book, ed. P. Hale, ISBN 0-9538711-0-X
- Booklet notes to several of his recordings.
