= Daniel Cook (musician) =

- Born: 7 September 1979 (age 46); England
- Genres: Classical/organ/choral
- Occupations: Organist and Master of the Choristers (Durham Cathedral)
- Instrument: Organ
- Labels: Priory Records, Hyperion Records

Daniel Cook (born 7 September 1979) is an organist, conductor and singer. Since Autumn 2017 he has been Master of the Choristers and Organist at Durham Cathedral.

In 2013 he was elected an Associate of the Royal Academy of Music (ARAM).

== Education and early career ==
Cook's first organ teacher was Keith Wright at Durham Cathedral. After a gap year as Organ Scholar of Worcester Cathedral, he studied at the Royal Academy of Music with Nicolas Kynaston, James O'Donnell and Patrick Russill, whilst also working as Organ Scholar of Southwark Cathedral and Westminster Abbey. Upon graduating with first-class honours, he was appointed Assistant Organist of Westminster Abbey.

== Cathedral career ==
=== Salisbury ===
In 2005, Cook was appointed Assistant Director of Music at Salisbury Cathedral. During his time at Salisbury, Cook made his debut solo organ recordings with Priory Records, a recording company with whom he has released 14 solo CDs to date. Most of these have been made on the world-famous Father Willis Organ in Salisbury, whose digital sampling for the Hauptwerk organ software Cook oversaw. Alongside his duties at the cathedral, Cook also conducted The Farrant Singers and founded The Mousai Singers, a group which he still conducts.

=== St Davids ===
Cook left Salisbury in 2011 to take up the posts of Organist & Master of the Choristers at St Davids Cathedral and Artistic Director of the St Davids Cathedral Festival. During his time in St Davids, Cook was also Music Director of the Dyfed Choir.

=== Westminster Abbey ===
In 2013, Cook was appointed Sub-Organist of Westminster Abbey. He played the organ for several special services broadcast on BBC Television, including services of thanksgiving on the 70th anniversary of VE Day and the 75th anniversary of the Battle of Britain. He accompanied the Abbey Choir on a CD release of music by Hubert Parry on Hyperion, which includes his own arrangement of Blest Pair of Sirens.

=== Durham ===
In 2017 he took up the office of Master of the Choristers and Organist at Durham Cathedral in Autumn 2017, succeeding James Lancelot who had held the position for 32 years.

== Miscellaneous ==
Cook is Artistic Director of the Mousai Singers.

== Discography ==
=== Solo ===
- The Complete Organ Works of Sir Edward Bairstow (Priory 2023)
- The Complete Organ Works of Sir William Harris (Priory 2020)
- Grand Organ of Westminster Abbey DVD (Priory 2018)
- The Complete Organ Works of C.V. Stanford Volume 5 (Priory 2017)
- Abbey Spectacular! (Priory, 2017)
- The Complete Organ Works of C.V. Stanford Volume 4 (Priory, 2016)
- The Complete Organ Works of C.V. Stanford Volume 3 (Priory, 2016)
- The Complete Organ Works of George Dyson (Priory, 2015)
- The Complete Organ Works of C.V. Stanford Volume 2 (Priory, 2015)
- Great European Organs No. 91, St Davids Cathedral (Priory, 2014)
- The Complete Organ Works of Herbert Sumsion Volume 2 (Priory, 2013)
- The Complete Organ Works of C.V. Stanford Volume 1 (Priory, 2013)
- The Complete Organ Works of Herbert Sumsion Volume 1 (Priory, 2013)
- Great European Organs No. 85, St George's Church, Cullercoats (Priory, 2012)
- The Complete Organ Works of Herbert Brewer (Priory, 2011)
- Great European Organs No. 83, St Bees Priory, Cumbria (Priory, 2011)
- The Organ Music of Sir Walter Alcock (Priory, 2009)

=== Conductor ===
- The Feast of David St Davids Cathedral Choir (Priory, 2013)
- The Welsh Connection The Mousai Singers (Mousai Records, 2013)

=== Accompanist ===
- Finzi, Bax & Ireland (Hyperion, 2017)
- Parry: I Was Glad & other choral works (Hyperion, 2015)
- The Complete Psalms of David Volume 2 (Priory, 2012)
- Bernard Naylor – The Nine Motets (Priory, 2010)
- Christmas at Salisbury Cathedral (Priory, 2010)
- Best Loved Anthems from Salisbury (Priory, 2007)
- The Resurrection – McEnery (Priory, 2007)
- The Virgin Mary's Journey (Griffin, 2006)
- In Gloria Dei Patris (Cantoris, 2002)

Cultural offices
Preceded by James Lancelot	Master of the Choristers and Organist Durham Cathedral; 2017–present
