= The Lion and the Unicorn =

Heraldic symbols of the United Kingdom

The lion and the unicorn as they appear on both versions of the Royal coat of arms of the United Kingdom. In the Scottish version (shown right) the two have switched places and both are crowned, and the lion on top is coloured red.

The Lion and the Unicorn are heraldic supporters appearing in the full royal coat of arms of the United Kingdom. The lion stands for England and the unicorn for Scotland. The combination dates back to the 1603 accession of James I of England who was already James VI of Scotland. They also appear the arms of Newfoundland since 1637, the arms of Hanover between 1837–1866, and the arms of Canada since 1921.

== Nursery rhyme ==
The traditional legend of enmity between the two heraldic animals is recorded in a nursery rhyme which has a Roud Folk Song Index number of 20170. It is usually given with the lyrics:

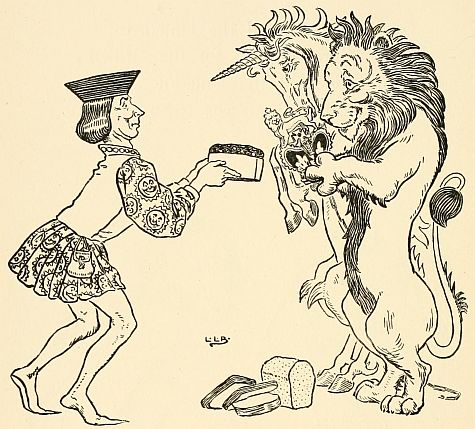
The Lion and the Unicorn as they appear in A Nursery Rhyme Picture Book by L. Leslie Brooke.

The lion and the unicorn
Were fighting for the crown
The lion beat the unicorn
All around the town.

Some gave them white bread,
And some gave them brown;
Some gave them plum cake
and drummed them out of town.

The legend of the two animals may have been intensified by the Acts of Union 1707 and it was one year later that William King (1663–1712) recorded a verse very similar to the first stanza of the modern rhyme. This seems to have grown to include several other verses. Apart from those above only one survives:

And when he had beat him out,
He beat him in again;
He beat him three times over,
His power to maintain.

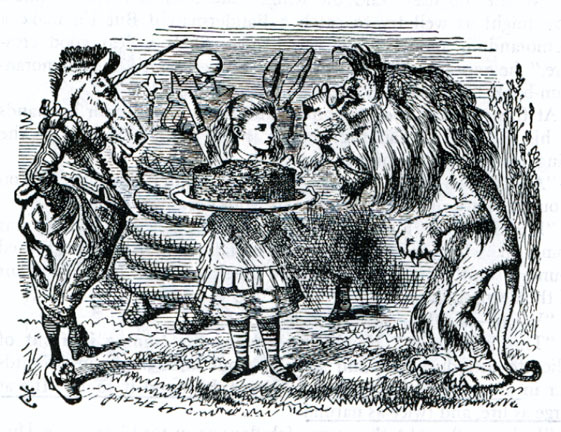
John Tenniel's illustration for Through the Looking-Glass.

This rhyme was played upon by Lewis Carroll, who incorporated the lion and the unicorn as characters in his 1871 novel Through the Looking-Glass. Here, the crown they are fighting for belongs to the White King which, given that they are on the White side as well, makes their rivalry all the more absurd. Carroll subverts the traditional view of a lion being alert and calculating by making this particular one slow and rather stupid, although clearly the better fighter. The role of the Unicorn is likewise reversed (or mirrored, as in a looking-glass) by the fact that he sees Alice as a "monster", though he promises to start believing in her if she will believe in him. Sir John Tenniel's illustrations for the section caricature Benjamin Disraeli as the Unicorn, and William Ewart Gladstone as the Lion, alluding to the pair's frequent parliamentary battles, although there is no evidence that this was Carroll's intention.

== See also ==
- Lion and Unicorn Staircase
- Royal coat of arms of Scotland
- Coat of arms of Canada
- Queen Elizabeth Gate
