= University of Glasgow Memorial Chapel =

Chapel in Glasgow City, Scotland

Coordinates: 55.87157°N 4.28971°W

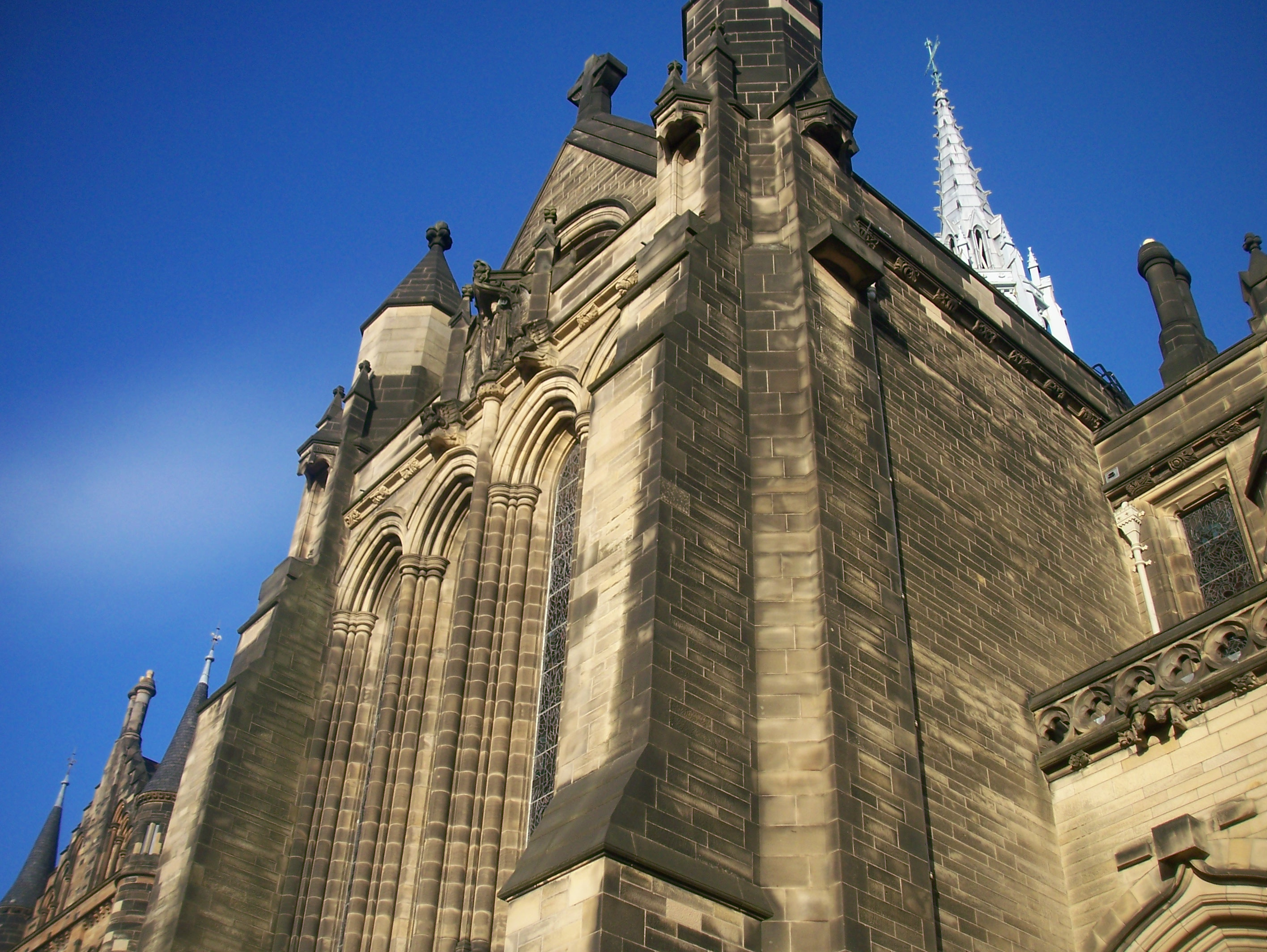

Religion
- Affiliation: Christian
- Leadership: Rev. Scott Blythe - Chaplain to the University
- Year consecrated: 1929
- Status: Active

Location
- Location: University of Glasgow
- Interactive map of University of Glasgow; Memorial Chapel

Architecture
- Architect: John James Burnet
- Style: Scots Gothic
- Groundbreaking: 1914
- Completed: 1929

Specifications
- Direction of façade: West
- Capacity: 320

Website
- www.gla.ac.uk/chaplaincy

The University of Glasgow Memorial Chapel is a chapel at the University of Glasgow, Scotland. It was consecrated on 4 October 1929, and is dedicated to the memory of the former students and staff of the university who died in the First World War. It is located in the West Quadrangle of the Main Building of the university, and was designed by John James Burnet. The chapel is protected as a category A listed building.

== History ==
The university's former premises on the High Street were on the site of an old Dominican monastery, known as the Black Friars, and the university used the friars' old church for services. The university subsequently relocated to Gilmorehill in 1870, although the New College was not finished for many years after, and there was at the time no chapel. The West Quadrangle of the new building was not enclosed on its west side originally; instead, staircases at either end of the court led onto The Square, where the professors and principal had their houses. The southern of these staircases was the Lion and Unicorn Staircase, which was relocated from its site in the Outer Court of the Old College. By 1900, the accommodation was already proving too small, and in 1914 it was decided to build a new wing enclosing the West Quadrangle, providing additional rooms and a chapel.

== Construction ==
John James Burnet was commissioned to draw up plans for the extension, and construction began in August 1914 but was halted by World War I. Work resumed in 1923 but was delayed by bad weather and economic conditions, and the buildings were not completed until 1929. The inside was fitted with wooden stalls and carvings by Archibald Dawson, and a series of ten stained glass windows, designed and made by Douglas Strachan and representing the entirety of human life as a spiritual enterprise, was installed in 1931. Amongst subsequent additions was the Benedicite Window, which is above the communion table at the East end of the building. It was designed by Lawrence Lee and installed in 1962.

== Dedication ==
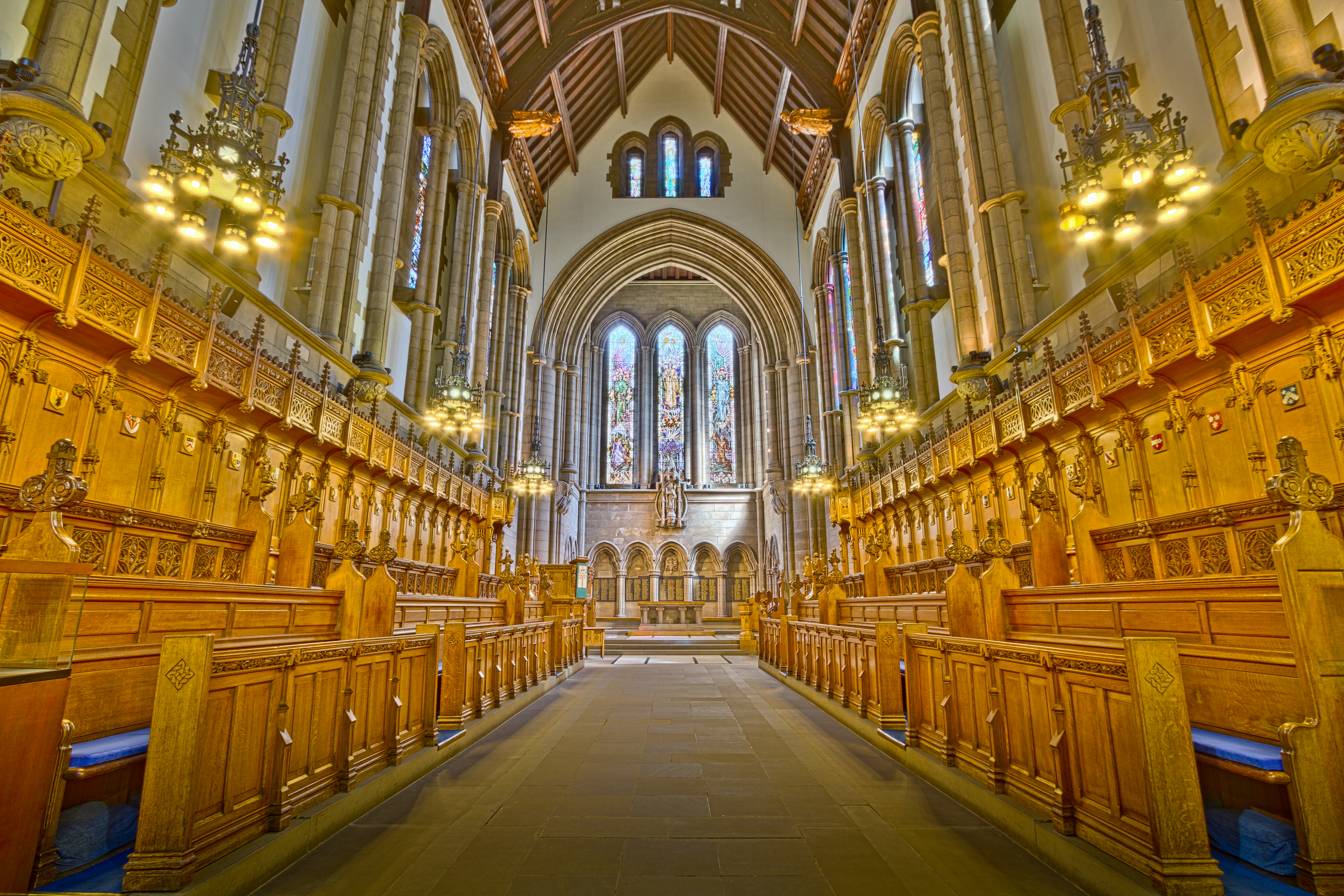
Interior of the Chapel

After World War I, it was decided that the new chapel should be dedicated to the memory of those seven hundred and fifty-five men connected with the university who had died in the conflict. The principal, Donald MacAlister, said:

After due deliberation it was agreed, with the consent of all, that their memory, and our gratitude for their devotion, should be associated with the place of our corporate worship, to the end that their example might be enduringly impressed upon Glasgow students in time to come.

The chapel was dedicated to their memory in a service on 4 October 1929, led by the Right Reverend John White. Tablets on the wall behind the Communion Table list the names of those who died, while other tablets besides the stalls record the 405 members of the university community who gave their lives in World War II.

== Services ==
Daily services are held in the chapel during term-time, as well as seasonal events. Before Christmas, there is a Service of Nine Lessons and Carols on the last Sunday of term, and a Watchnight service on Christmas Eve. Graduates, students, members of staff and the children of members of staff are entitled to be married in the chapel, which is also used for baptisms and funerals. Civil marriages and civil partnerships may be blessed in the chapel, although under UK law^{[Scots Law?]} may not be performed there.

The current chaplain of the university is the Reverend Scott Blythe, and the university appoints honorary chaplains of other denominations and faiths.

== Organ ==
The chapel's organ was constructed by Henry Willis & Sons in 1927 and refurbished by Harrison & Harrison in 2005. It was a gift to the university from Joseph Maclay, Lord Maclay, in memory of two of his sons, who had died in the war. The organist is Kevin Bowyer, an acclaimed performer and prolific recorder, who is artistic director of the Glasgow International Organ Festival, which is held in the chapel and has been running annually since June 2006.

== Chapel Choir ==
The Chapel Choir sings at services and concerts every Tuesday evening at 6pm during term-time, and at other events in the chapel, such as the Remembrance Sunday service, Service of Nine Lessons and Carols, and weddings. The choir is composed of between twenty-eight and thirty-two singers, including students, staff and graduates, and takes SATB form. The choir has recorded widely and completed a number of tours, including the United States (2002), when it sang at the Sunday morning service in Saint Thomas Church on Fifth Avenue; Germany (1999, 2000, 2004, 2010); the Baltic states (2007); Tuscany (2009); Amsterdam (2012); Sweden (2016); and China (2018). The director of chapel music is Katy Lavinia Cooper, who was appointed in April 2015 after James Grossmith left to become chorusmaster of the Royal Swedish Opera.
