= Pauli Pietiläinen =

Finnish concert organist

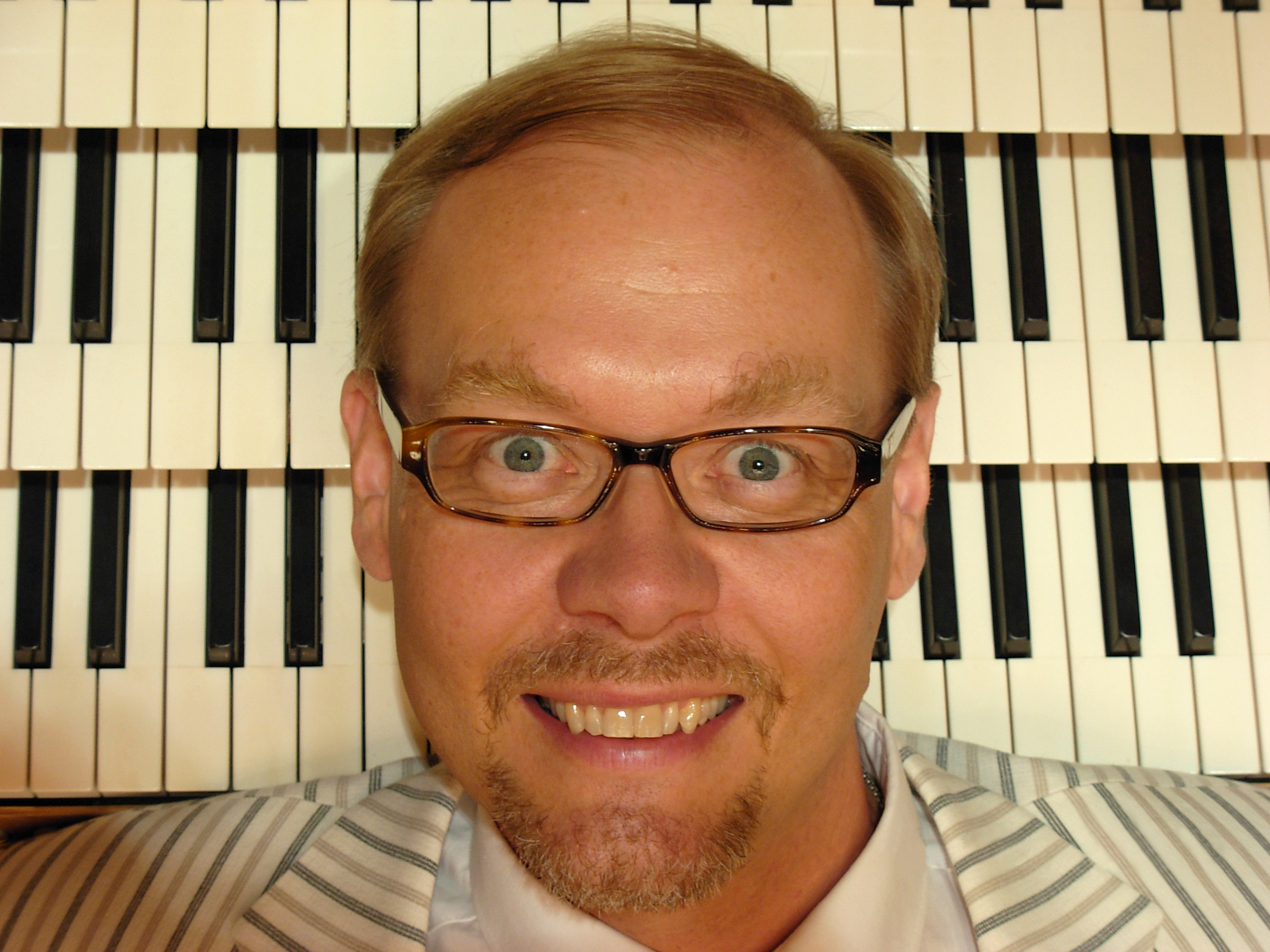
Pauli Pietiläinen

Concert organist Pauli Pietiläinen (born 1961) studied organ performance and church music from 1980 at the Sibelius Academy in Helsinki, Finland. Pauli Pietiläinen graduated in 1986 and finished his degree with highest honors in organ performance and improvisation in 1988. He has participated in many masterclasses and completed his studies with Wolfgang Rübsam in Chicago and Anders Bondeman in Stockholm. Pietiläinen gave his debut recital in 1992.

Mr. Pietiläinen combines musicianship and originality with a constant curiosity and a delightful sense of humor and he has a particular interest in playing organ arrangements and organ improvisation. Pauli Pietiläinen has performed in Finland and has made recordings for the Finnish Broadcasting Company and CDs. In addition to Finland, he has given recitals in Sweden, Germany, France (Notre-Dame, Paris etc.), Switzerland, Italy, the U.S., Russia, Poland, Hungary, Argentina, Singapore and Hong Kong.

2000-2005 the titular organist in Turku Cathedral. In 2005, Pauli Pietiläinen was appointed to the Ristinkirkko Church in Lahti, Finland, where he is also responsible for the direction of the Choir of the Church of the Cross and in its programme of concerts.
