= Priory Records =

British record label

- Founded: 1980; 46 years ago
- Founder: Neil Collier; Paul Crichton
- Status: Active
- Distributor: Self‑distributed
- Genre: Church and organ / Classical
- Country of origin: United Kingdom
- Location: Leighton Buzzard, Bedfordshire, England
- Official website: www.prioryrecords.co.uk

Priory Records is a record company in the UK founded in 1980, and devoted mostly to church music and organ music. Important projects have included the complete Psalms sung by cathedral choirs to Anglican chant, all of the Magnificat and Nunc dimittis settings by Herbert Howells, the "British Church Composer Series", the "Choral and Music from English Cathedrals", the "Music for Evensong" and, more recently, all the hymns in the complete New English Hymnal Series. There are also three discs of the Communion Service settings of Stanford and four further discs featuring settings of the Te Deum and Jubilate (by various composers).

Priory has made over 1000 recordings over the life of the company. Around 600 of these were commercial album releases, with the remaining 400 produced as private pressings.

== Great European Organs ==
The collection of CDs "Great European Organs" is dedicated to the discovery of European organs, and covered hundreds of instruments across the continent. Internationally recognised organists involved in the project include: Kevin Bowyer, Daniel Roth, Nicolas Kynaston, Graham Barber, David Briggs, John Scott, Gerard Brooks, Jane Watts, Roger Sayer, Colin Walsh, Christopher Herrick, Stephen Farr, John Scott Whiteley, Stephen Cleobury, Stefan Engels, Daniel Cook, Marco Lo Muscio, Nicholas Jackson, Naji Hakim, Dame Gillian Weir, etc.

== Other Series ==
Other Organ collections include: the complete works by Olivier Messiaen performed by Dame Gillian Weir, "Great Australasian Organs", "Victorian Organ Sonatas", "Christmas Organ Music", "Organ Master Series", "Organ Concertos", "Concert Hall Series"; the "Complete Organ Works" by: Sigfrid Karg-Elert, Herbert Sumsion, Camille Saint-Saëns, Eugène Gigout, Hubert Parry, Percy Whitlock, Frank Bridge, Ralph Vaughan Williams, Joseph Jongen, Kenneth Leighton, Henri Mulet, William Mathias, Samuel Sebastian Wesley.

== Neil Collier ==
Neil Collier
- Born: Neil Vaughan Robert Collier; April 1951 (age 75); Watford, Hertfordshire, England
- Education: Berkhamsted School
- Occupations: Music producer; Recording engineer; Managing director
- Years active: 1980–present
- Known for: Co-founder and managing director of Priory Records
- Children: Ben Collier, Lucy Collier
- Father: Derrick Collier
- Honors: Honorary Member of the Royal School of Church Music (HonRSCM; awarded 2018)

Neil Collier (born April 1951) is the managing director of Priory Records, and also serves as the label's primary producer and recording engineer. He grew up in Boxmoor, Hertfordshire, and was educated at Berkhamsted School, where he was head chorister in the chapel choir.

In his twenties, Collier sang with The Corporation, a vocal group that performed regularly for BBC television, notably on the music series Beat That Drum, a spinoff of Play Away. He met Paul Crichton in musical circles, and founded the company, with Crichton (a Central Television sound producer) initially in charge of recording and editing, and Collier in charge of Sales. Collier had been working in sales since leaving school, and from this point onwards, whilst visiting customers, would also pop into record shops, to promote Priory releases. Over time, Collier learned production and editing skills, and around 1990, bought Crichton's share in the business.

In recognition of his contributions to church music and recorded sacred repertoire, he was made an honorary member of the Royal School of Church Music (HonRSCM) in 2018.
