= Stephen Tharp =

American organist and composer (born 1970)

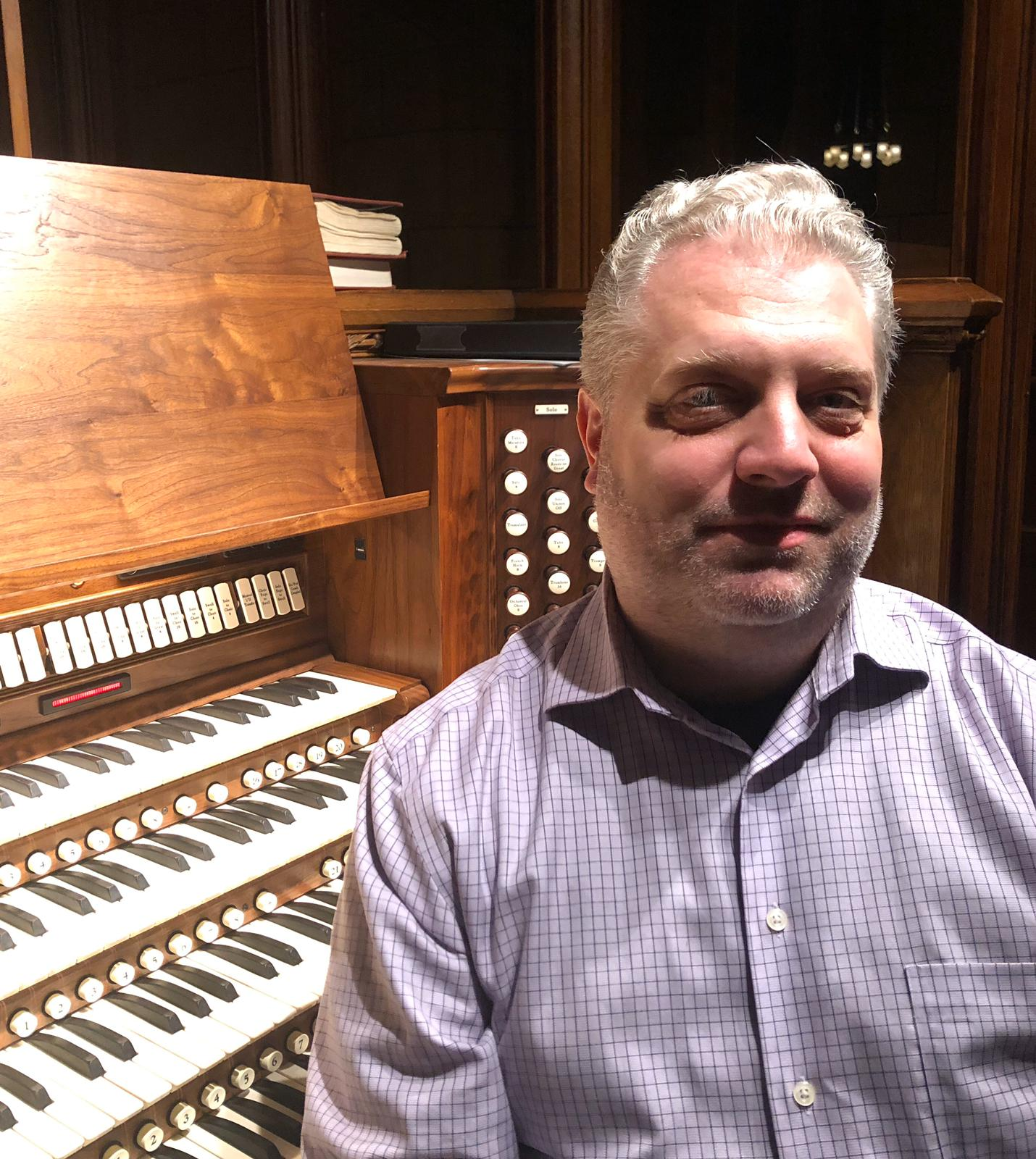
Stephen Tharp, 2019

Stephen J. Tharp (born 12 April 1970) is an American organist and composer.

== Education and training ==
Tharp received a Bachelor of Arts degree from Illinois College and a Master of Music degree from Northwestern University, where he studied with Rudolf Zuiderveld and Wolfgang Rübsam, respectively. He also studied privately in Paris with Jean Guillou.

== Career ==
From 1995 to 1997, Tharp served as organist at St. Patrick's Cathedral in New York, and, from 1998 to 2002, he was associate organist at St. Bartholomew's Church in the same city. In 2008, he was selected as the official organist during Pope Benedict XVI's visit to New York, playing at three major events that were attended by more than 60,000 people.

Between 2007 - 2013, Tharp served as artist-in-residence at Grace Church in New York, and from 2014 - 2023 at St. James' Church on Madison Avenue. In September 2025, he was appointed artist-in-residence at Riverside Church.

Tharp has performed extensively as a concert organist, having played at over 1,600 concerts during more than 60 tours worldwide. He has given masterclasses at venues such as Yale University, Westminster Choir College and Cleveland Institute of Music, and has served on juries for competitions at Juilliard School and Northwestern University.

In addition to being a composer and transcriber in his own right, Tharp is a frequent performer of modern works, having premiered those of Philip Moore, Anthony Newman, Thierry Escaich, and others. He also plays the piano and harpsichord.

Tharp has recorded numerous CDs, including works by Jeanne Demessieux, Marcel Dupré, Louis Vierne, and Charles-Marie Widor.

== Awards and recognition ==
Tharp has been described as "one of the most brilliant concert organists around these days". His recording of the complete organ works of Jeanne Demessieux won the Preis der Deutschen Schallplattenkritik in 2009. In 2011, he was named International Performer of the Year by the New York City chapter of the American Guild of Organists, and, in 2015, he won the Paul Creston Award.

Listed in Who's Who in America and Who's Who in the World, Tharp has also featured in a number of programs on American Public Media's Pipedreams.

== Discography ==
- Louis Vierne: Complete Organ Symphonies, Vol. III, Aeolus (2019)
- Stephen Tharp: The St. James's Recital, Aeis (2016)
- Variations on "Rouen" (Iste Confessor), iTunes (2012)
- Stephen Tharp Plays Bach's Goldberg Variations, JAV Recordings (2011)
- Organ Classics from Saint Patrick's Cathedral in New York City, JAV Recordings (2010)
- Stephen Tharp Plays the Organ at Saint Bavo, Haarlem, JAV Recordings (2009)
- Jeanne Demessieux: The Complete Organ Works, Aeolus (2009)
- Duruflé: Messe Cum Jubilo, JAV Recordings (2009)
- Hymns Old and New, JAV Recordings (2008)
- Stephen Tharp Plays the Anderson Organ, JAV Recordings (2007)
- Marcel Dupré: Le Chemin de la Croix, JAV Recordings (2005)
- The Widor Mass, Op. 36, JAV Recordings (2005)
- The Art of the Symphonic Organist, Vol. II, JAV Recordings (2004)
- Stephen Tharp at St. Sulpice, Paris, France, JAV Recordings (2002)
- Stephen Tharp: Debut in Europe, Organum Classics (2001)
- Stephen Tharp at Trumbull, Ethereal Recordings (1999)
- World Premieres and Transcriptions, Vol. I, Ethereal Recordings (1998)
- Legendary Organ Works, Vol. I, Ethereal Recordings (1997)
- Mendelssohn: The Six Organ Sonatas, Naxos (1996)
