= Inverkeithing Mercat Cross =

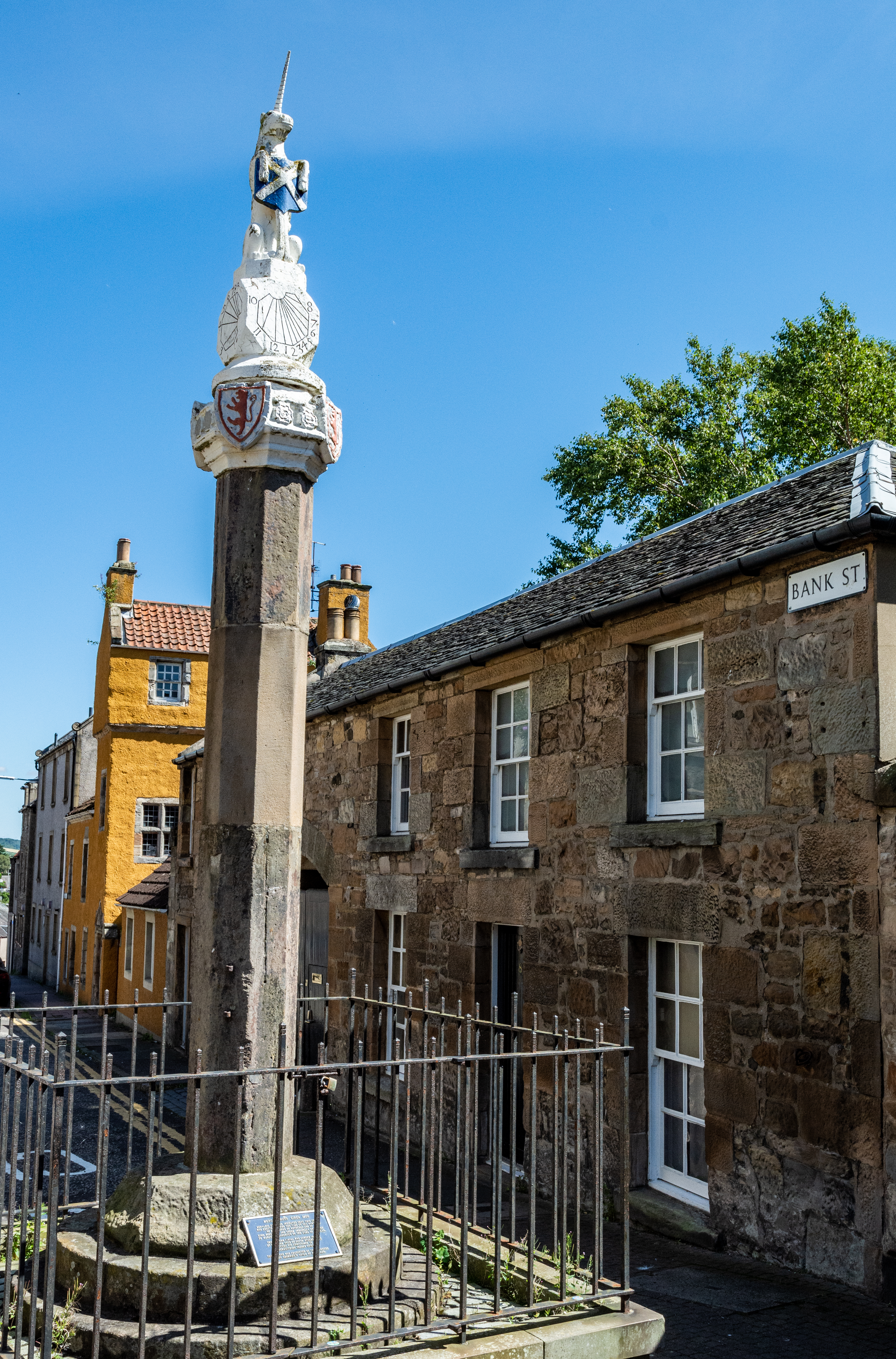
- Inverkeithing Mercat Cross

- Shown in Fife
- 56°01′51″N 3°23′52″W
- Location: Bank Street, Inverkeithing

History
- Built: c. 1398

Listed Building – Category A
- Official name: Bank Street, Mercat Cross
- Designated: 11 December 1972
- Reference no.: LB35088

Inverkeithing Mercat Cross dates from 1389, and is one of the oldest and finest remaining medieval mercat crosses in Scotland. It is located in the town of Inverkeithing in Fife, and is a category A listed historic monument.

== History ==
The core of the Mercat Cross dates from 1398; it is believed to have been built as a memorial of the marriage between the Duke of Rothesay and the daughter of the Earl of Douglas.

In the 16th century, the octagonal stone shaft was added, and in 1688 unicorn was carved by Mr John Boyd.

== Description ==
The cross features a carved unicorn of Scotland, featuring a sundial and holding a saltire flag.

The unicorn is supported on a base of four heraldic shields (two of the Royal arms of Scotland facing South East and South West; and that facing North East depicting Douglas coat of arms; and that to North West depicting the arms of King Robert III and Queen Annabella Drummond), interspaced with roses.

The mercat cross is on a 16th-century octagonal shaft, with replacement stone to the middle.

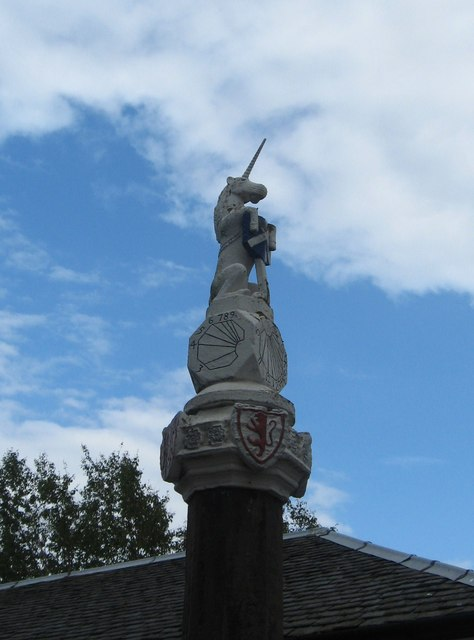
Close up of the unicorn of Inverkeithing Mercat Cross.

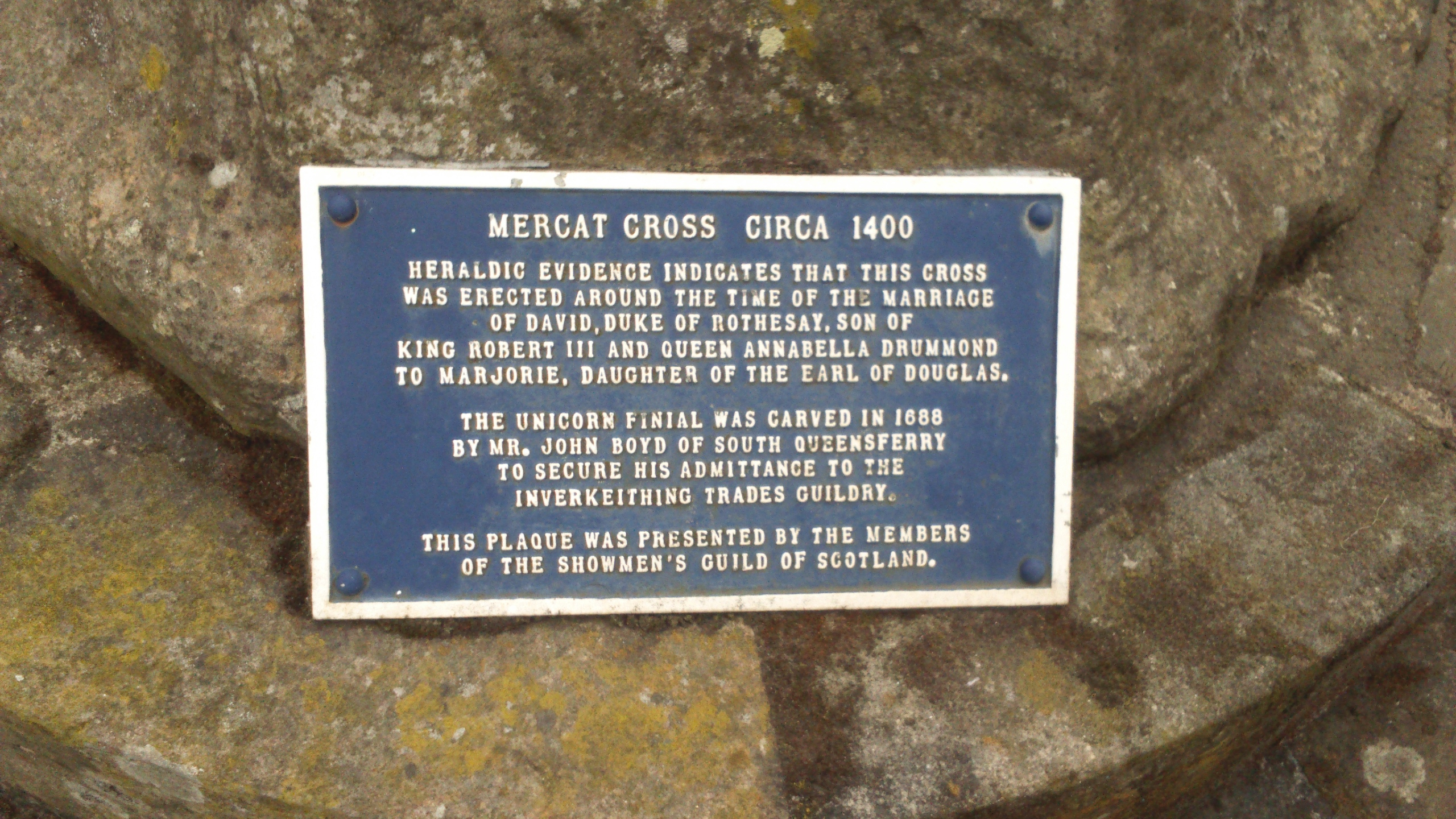
The plaque on the mercat cross

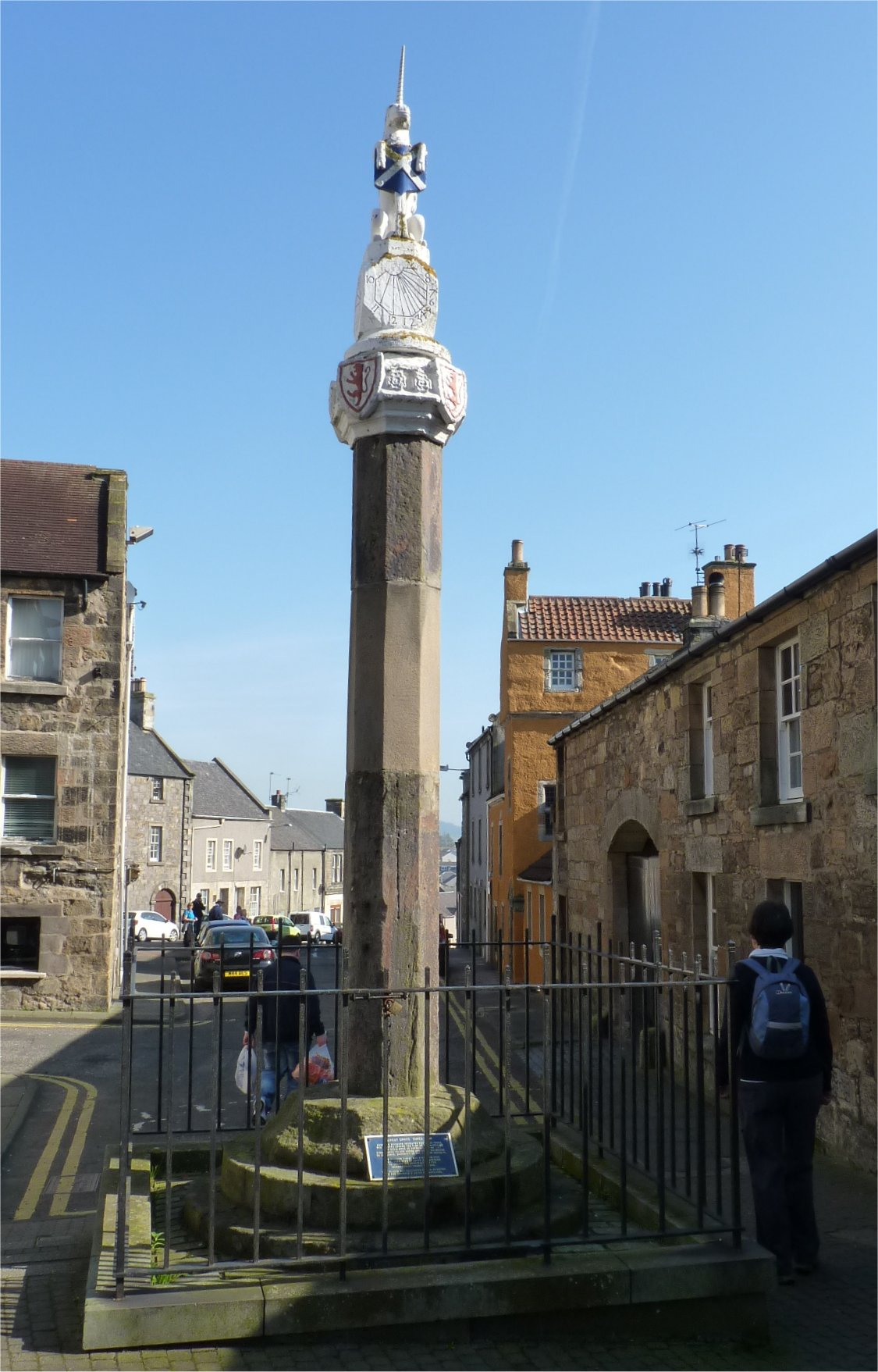
The mercat cross straight on.

== Location ==
Originally, the cross stood on the north end of Inverkeithing High Street. It was moved to face the Inverkeithing Town Hall in 1799. Then in 1974, it was moved to the junction between Bank Street and High Street.

In 2021, plans were announced to preserve and renovate the mercat cross and move it to a more prominent position in the Market Square, which was completed in 2026. However the paved area on which it was to stand is still not there as of the beginning of July 2026 and it stands among building rubble and within a fenced off area.

== Listed status ==
The mercat cross became a scheduled monument on 17 November 1949.

The mercat cross was awarded category A listed status by Historic Scotland on 11 December 1972.
