= Colin Walsh (organist) =

English organist

Colin Walsh is an English organist, who has played many recitals in various religious venues in England as well as two at the Royal Festival Hall. He has also played in many European countries and New Zealand, Australia, Canada and the USA. Some of his work has been released on the Priory label. He has worked as an organist or assistant organist at St George's Chapel, Windsor Castle; Christ Church Cathedral, Oxford; Salisbury Cathedral (1978-1985); St Albans Cathedral (1985-1988); and Lincoln Cathedral. In July 2002 there were plans to sack Walsh, whom The Telegraph described as "one of Europe's finest church organists", after differences with the Precentor, Andrew Stokes; however this plan was dropped and he was given a new role. Since January 2003 he has been Organist Laureate of Lincoln Cathedral. Colin Walsh has an honorary doctorate from Lincoln University.

== Discography ==
- Ch. M. Widor: Organ Symphonies No 5&6. Guild Records. (GMCD 7305)
- English Organ Music. Priory Records. (PRCD 379)
- French Organ Music. Priory Records. (PRCD 5023)
- Organ Works by Dupré, Langlais, Vierne, Litaize, Messiaen and Ropartz. Guild Records. (GMCD 7278)
- Popular Organ Music. Priory Records. (PRCD 281)
- Two Willis Organs. Priory Records. (PRCD 648)
- J.S. Bach from Lincoln. Colin Walsh plays the Organ of Lincoln Cathedral. Priory Records. (PRCD 1203)

Cultural offices
Preceded by David Flood	Organist and Master of the Choristers of Lincoln Cathedral; 1988–	Succeeded by
