= Inverkeithing War Memorial =

War memorial in Inverkeithing, Fife, Scotland

- United Kingdom
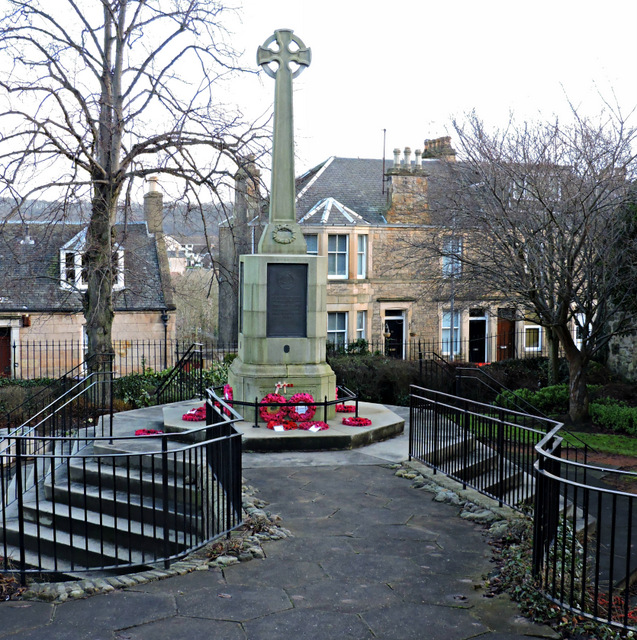
- For Casualties in WWI and WWII from Inverkeithing
- Unveiled: 14 April 1923
- Location: 56.031945°N 3.396707°W; Church Street, Inverkeithing, Scotland
- Designed by: Peter Reid
- Commemorated: 166

Listed Building – Category C(S)
- Official name: Church Street, War Memorial
- Designated: 4 August 2004
- Reference no.: LB49941

Inverkeithing War Memorial is a war memorial in Inverkeithing in Fife, Scotland, commemorating the 166 men of the town lost in the First and Second World Wars. The memorial is set in a memorial garden, was originally built in 1923 and is category C listed by Historic Scotland.

== History ==
130 men from Inverkeithing died during the First World War, 1914 - 1918. Inverkeithing War Memorial was designed and built by Peter Reid in 1923, to commemorate the men of Inverkeithing lost in WWI. The unveiling ceremony took place on 14th April 1923, and the memorial was unveiled by Edward James Bruce, Earl of Elgin and Kincardine.

To accompany the war memorial, a roll of honour with the names of 265 who served in WWI was produced for Inverkeithing Parish Church and is placed at the vestibule of the church.

36 men and women of Inverkeithing died during WWII, 1939 - 1945. After 1945, an additional plaque was added to the memorial to commemorate those lost in WWII. This plaque was unveiled in 1950.

12 of Inverkeithing's war dead are buried in the town at Hope Street Cemetery.

Originally located in the grounds of Inverkeithing Primary School, the memorial was relocated to new war memorial gardens adjacent to Inverkeithing Church at Church Street in June 1973.

In 2004, Historic Environment Scotland awarded category C listed status to Inverkeithing War Memorial.

== Description ==
The memorial is a granite monolithic with a hexagonal base, on top of a 6 step staircase that surrounds the memorial. The top is a moulded Celtic Cross and a carving of wreath. The faces of the memorial feature bronze plaques, which feature the burgh coat of arms, and dedications.

The dedication plaque to the First World War dead reads: "TO THE GLORY OF GOD AND IN LOVING MEMORY OF THE MEN OF INVERKEITHING AND DISTRICT WHO FELL IN THE GREAT WAR 1914-1919 THEIR NAME LIVETH FOR EVERMORE". The names of all 130 Inverkeithing male casualties of WWI are listed on a bronze plaque.

The dedication plaque to the Second World War dead reads: "AND IN THE LOVING MEMORY OF THE MEN AND WOMEN/ OF INVERKEITHING AND DISTRICT WHO FELL IN THE WORLD WAR 1939-1945". The names of all 36 Inverkeithing casualties of WWII are listed on a bronze plaque.

== Photographs ==
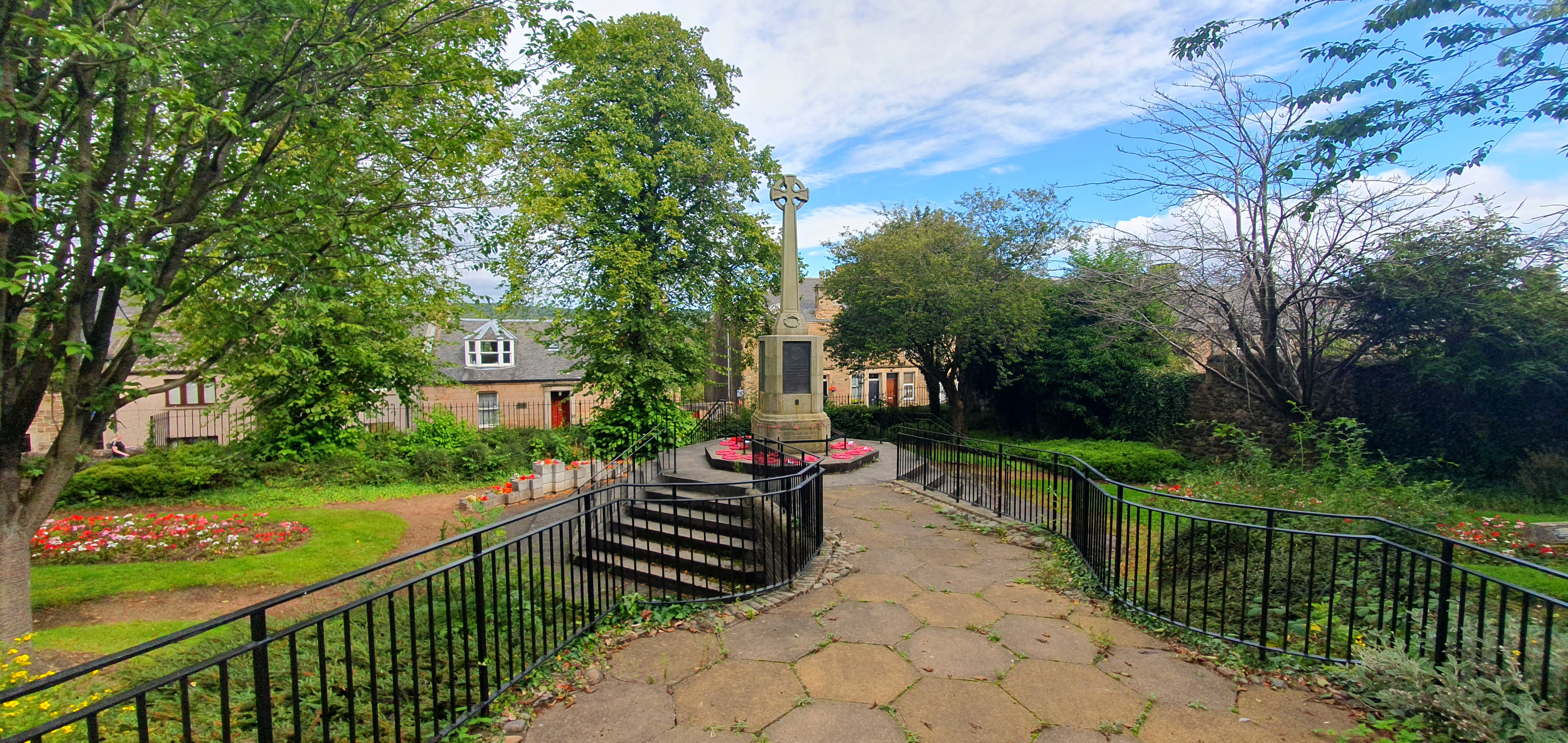
Inverkeithing War Memorial within War Memorial Gardens.

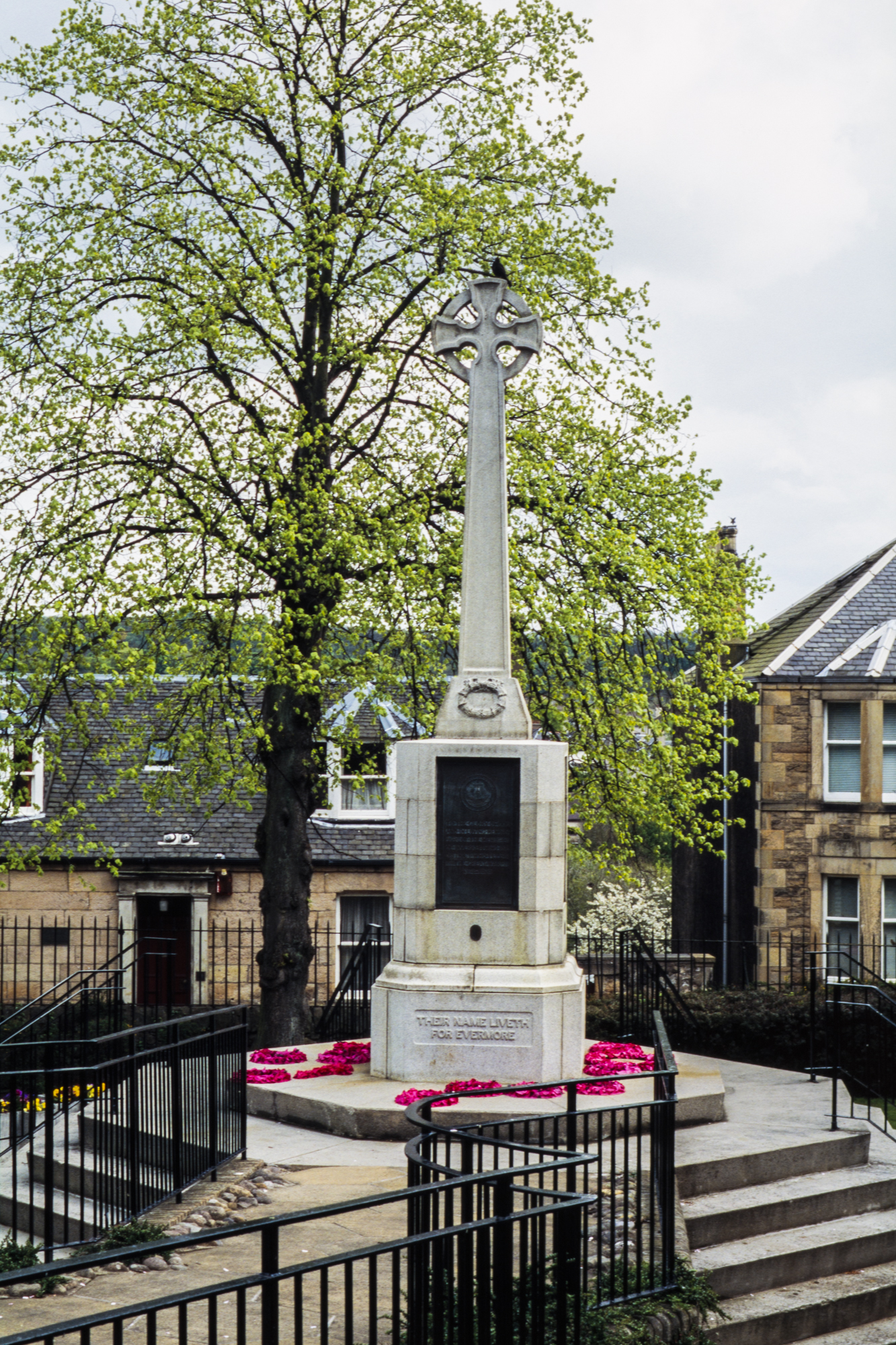
Inverkeithing War Memorial surrounded by Wreaths for Remembrance Day.
