= Thomson's House =

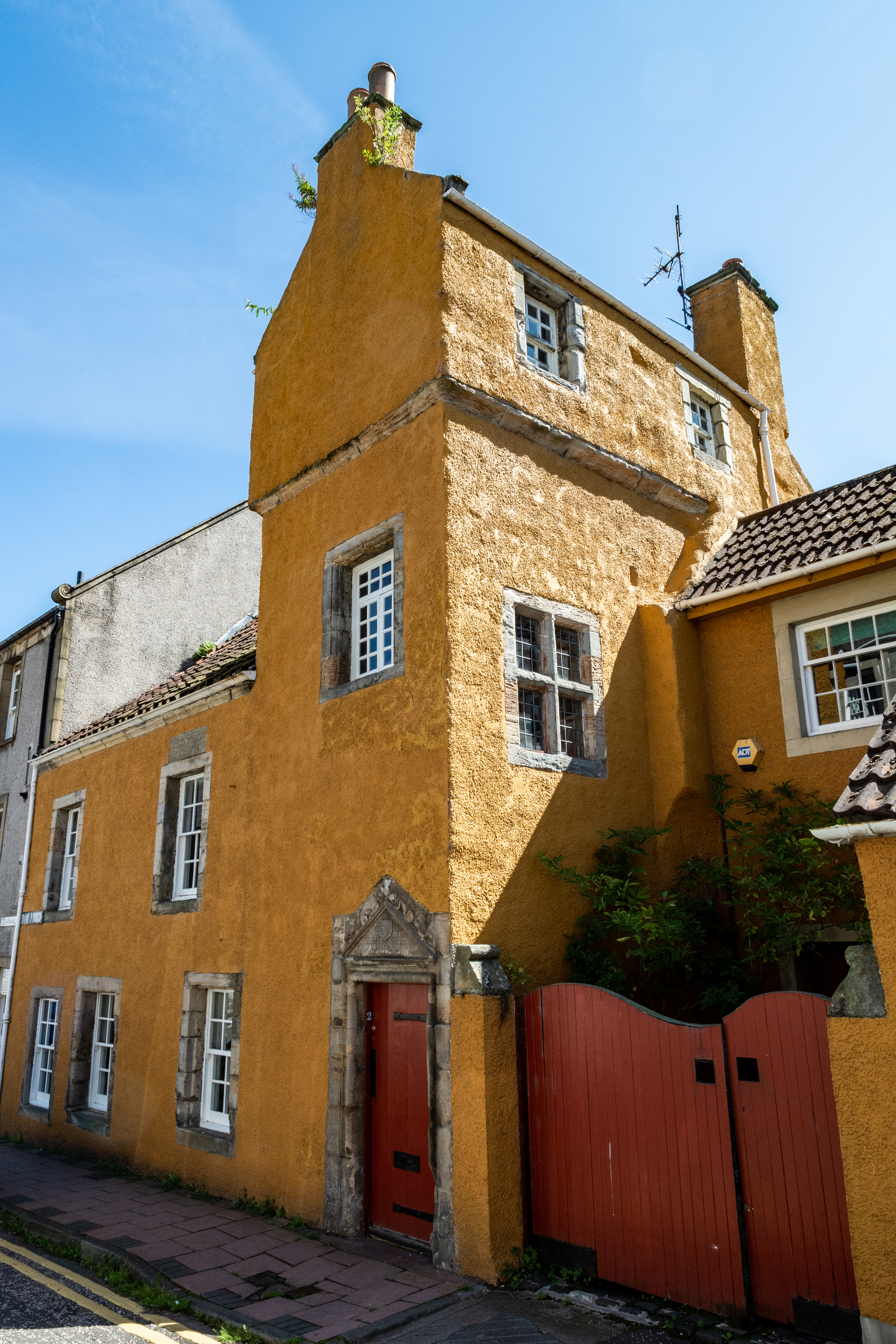
- Thomsoun's House from south aspect.

- Shown in Fife
- 56°01′52″N 3°23′49″W
- Location: 2-4 Bank Street, Inverkeithing

History
- Built: 1617

Site notes
- Restored by: Peter J. Findlay

Listed Building – Category A
- Official name: 2, 4 Bank Street, Thomson's House
- Designated: 11/12/1972
- Reference no.: LB35090

Thomson's House, built in 1617, is a traditional burgh town house located on Bank Street, Inverkeithing in Fife, Scotland. A pre-eminent example of its type, the house is category A listed by Historic Scotland.

== History ==
Thomson's House, which dates from 1617, was built for John Thomson and his wife Bessie, as indicated by a stone lintel above the entrance showing the initials IT and BT, as well as a merchant's mark and an inscription of psalm 127. John Thomson was a Burgess of Inverkeithing. Bettie Thomson died on 14 April, 1621.

In the early 18th century, the house was owned by the Earl of Rosebery.

It was sold in 1724 to Henry Cunningham, Whig MP and former Governor of Jamaica, who appears in Walter Scott's Rob Roy.

In 1793 the house belonged to William Greig, son of Charles Grieg, shipmaster in Inverkeithing. The Edinburgh Architectural Association (1896) suggest Samuel Greig lived in the house as a boy.

This house was restored between 1964 and 1966 by former owner Peter J. Findlay. This included an extension to the south of the property around 1966, replacing a gap which was formerly the site of the Old Music Hall (built around 1859 and burned in 1957).

In December 1972, the house was granted grade A listing by Historic Scotland. Their statement of special interest for Thomson's House indicates: "[the house] is the best-preserved example of 17th century domestic burgh architecture in Inverkeithing and is a pre-eminent example of its type, similar to some of the best buildings in Culross".

== Architecture ==
Thomson's House is a traditional 17th-century burgh town house. The house is three storeys, with a three-stage corbelled cap-house stair tower to the south west corner of the property.

The house features vibrant mustard yellow lime harling to the outside.

The front features a carved over-door pediment and window lintel panel. Partially faded, the pediment reads: 'IT BT / EXCEPT THE / LORD BVLD [sic] THE HOVS THEY / LABOVR IN VAINE THAT BVILD/ IT. PSALM –- –17'.

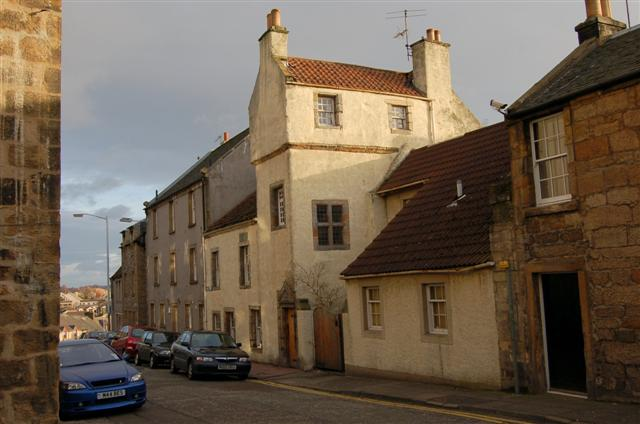
Thomsoun's House with previous white lime render.

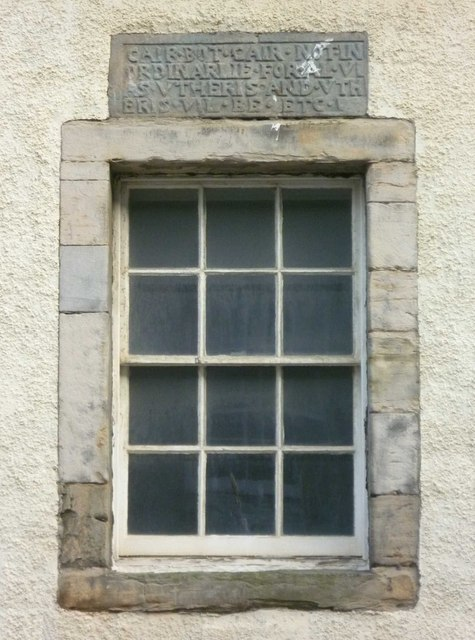
Carved stone lintel, first floor

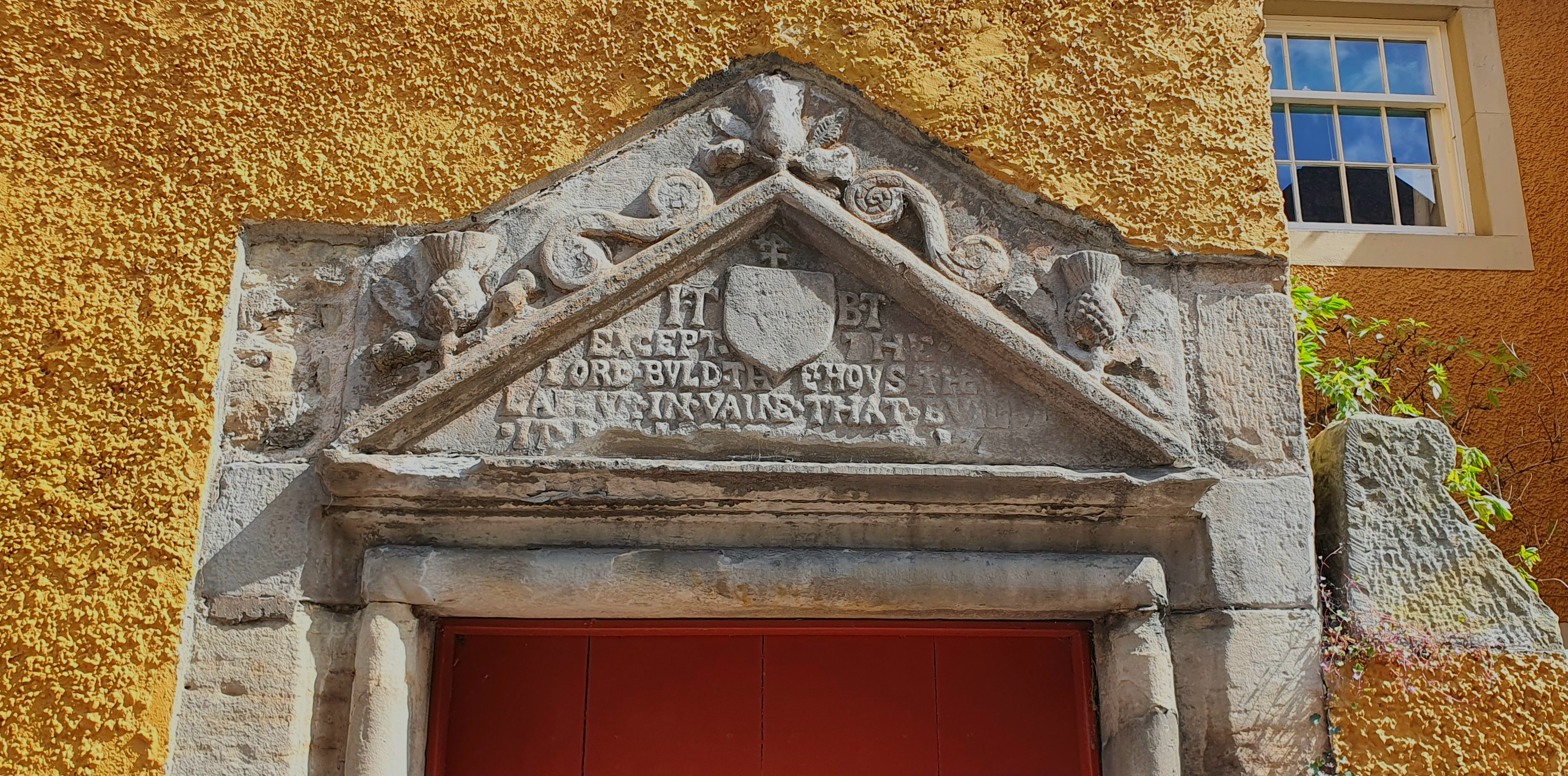
Carved stone lintel with IT and BT initials, above front door (1617).

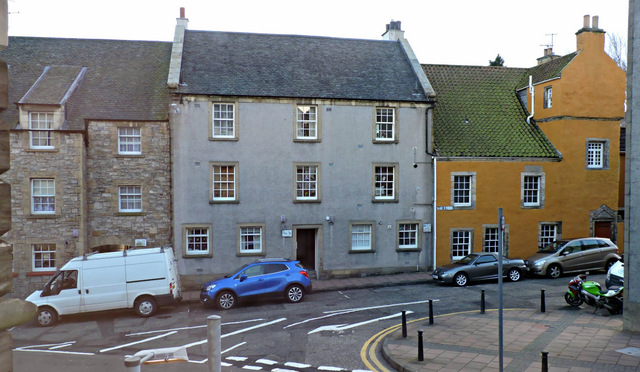
Thomson's House within Bank Street, Inverkeithing.
