= Moffat Cottage =

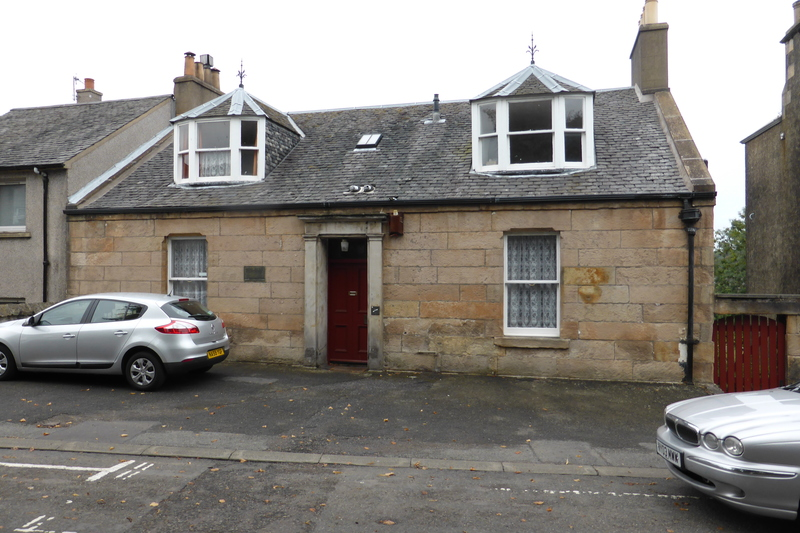
- Moffat Cottage from Heriot Street, Inverkeithing
- Interactive map of Moffat Cottage
- 56°01′56″N 3°23′45″W
- Location: Heriot Street, Inverkeithing

History
- Built: Early 19th century

Listed Building – Category C(S)
- Official name: 13 Heriot Street, Moffat Cottage, including Summerhouse
- Designated: 19 December 1979
- Reference no.: LB35104

Moffat Cottage is an early 19th century home in Inverkeithing in Fife, Scotland.

The cottage is important to the Scottish missionary movement as the former home of Robert Moffat, and is associated with David Livingstone and his family.

== History ==
The site of Moffat Cottage was originally a monastic possession of Arbroath Abbey, and was called the lands of St Thomas. It was occupied by a lodgings for Abbey Monks.

The cottage is the site of the former St Erat's well, an early medieval well associated with St Erat, supposedly where he would preach. The street Moffat cottage stands on - Heriot Street - is an orthographic variation of Erat.

Moffat Cottage was built around 1811 by Robert Moffat, father of the missionary Robert Moffat (1795-1883). Moffat was the first man to translate the bible into an African language, and was a pioneer of the Kuruman Mission.

Robert Moffat's daughter Mary married David Livingstone in 1845. Mary accompanied Livingstone on expeditions but in 1852 her health and her children's education forced her return to Scotland.

David Livingstone, Moffat's son in law, is believed to have lived in the building during his first return to Britain between 1856 - 1858, and again in 1864 - 1865. It is believed he built the summer house in the garden. A commemorative plaque indicated Livingstone lived in the cottage at intervals between 1855 and 1865.

The cottage later served as a doctors surgery, before returning as a private residence.

In December 1979, Moffat Cottage received Category C listed status from Historic Scotland.

== Description ==
Moffat cottage is listed as a "substantial 19th century cottage" in Historic Scotland's statement of interest in the building. It is single storey and features a summerhouse believed to have been constructed by David Livingstone.
