= Fordell's Lodging =

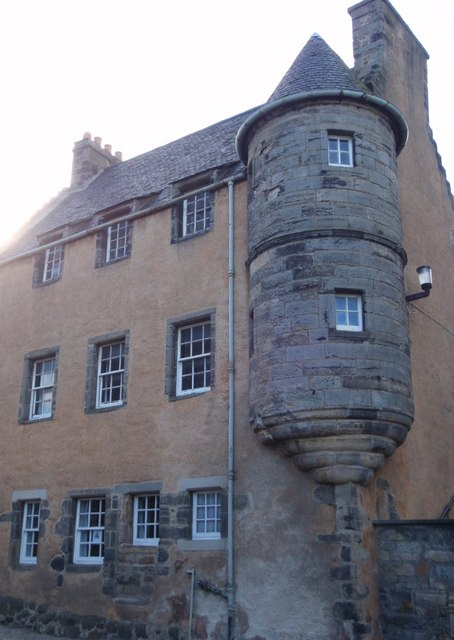
- Fordell's Lodging, 2009.

- Shown in Fife
- 56°01′54″N 3°23′51″W
- Location: 16 - 18 Church Street, Inverkeithing

History
- Built: 1666 - 1671
- Built for: John Henderson, 1st Baronet

Listed Building – Category A
- Official name: 16, 18 Church Street, Fordell's Lodging
- Designated: 11th December 1972
- Reference no.: LB35103

Fordell's Lodging is a baronial townhouse built between 1666 and 1671 in Inverkeithing in Fife, Scotland. It was awarded category A listed status by Historic Scotland in 1972.

== History ==
During the 12th century, a monk's Teind Barn, where tithes were collected, was located behind the site of Fordell's Lodging, and was still standing until the 18th century.

Fordell's Lodging was built between 1666 and 1671 for Scottish nobleman Sir John Henderson of Fordell, 1st Baronet Henderson of Fordell (Nova Scotia), whose family held the office of hereditary provost and sheriff of Inverkeithing by a grant of Queen Mary.

According to Cunningham (1899), James II of England stayed at Fordell's lodging in the late 17th century.

Fordell's Lodging was converted into a church hall for Inverkeithing Parish Church in the 1920s. By 2024, it had been restored as a residential property.

Fordell's Lodging was awarded category A listed status by Historic Scotland in December 1972, reserved for "a building of national or international importance, considered an outstanding example of a particular period, style, or building type". The listing describes Fordell's Lodging as "one of Inverkeithing's most intact 17th century buildings" and "a very fine example of a 17th century town house built for a local landowner in one of the wealthy coastal towns of Fife".

== Architecture ==
The townhouse is an L-plan traditional townhouse with two stories and an attic, with a striking angle turret and conical roof.

The interior features a plaster armorial panel to King Charles II, King of England, Scotland and Ireland from 1660 to 1685.

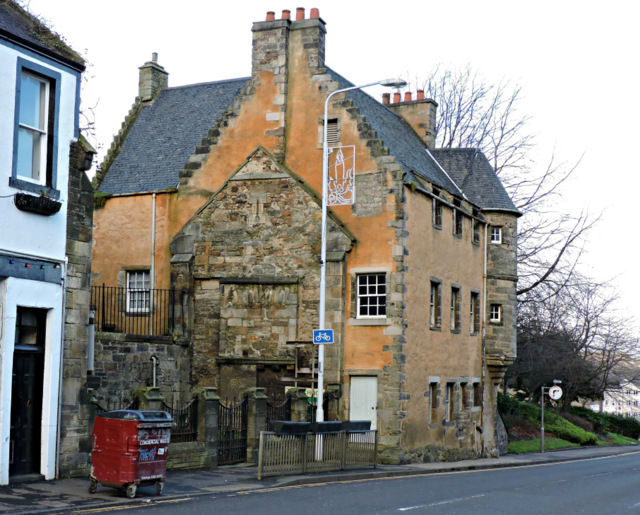
Fordell's lodging from south aspect.
