= Inverkeithing witch hunt =

Witch hunt in Scotland

- Timespan: 1621 - 1655
- Location: Inverkeithing, Fife, Scotland
- Number of trials: Unknown
- Executions: At least 51
- Reasons for beginning: Appointment of Walter Bruce; crop failure; outbreak of cholera.
- Occurred within the context of: Scottish Reformation, Scottish Folk Beliefs, Poverty, De-centralised system of government

The Inverkeithing witch hunt took place in Inverkeithing in Fife, Scotland between 1621 and 1655. At least 51 people were tried and executed for witchcraft.

The first set of prosecutions occurred between 1621-3, and resumed in 1649 after the appointment of Walter Bruce as minister for Inverkeithing. The hunt, trials and executions were part of a series witch trials in early modern Scotland.

== Context ==
The first major witchcraft persecution in Scotland was the North Berwick witch trials of 1590, and in 1597 James VI published Daemonologie.

In 1608-9, Inverkeithing had an outbreak of plague, and in 1632 there was an outbreak of cholera.

During the 1640s, famine and plague swept Scotland caused by the civil war.

In 1641, Walter Bruce - a prominent 'witch hunter' - was appointed minister of Inverkeithing Church.

In the 17th century, church records of Inverkeithing had denounced examples of superstitious behaviour, which included: "carrying the dead body about the Kirk before burial", "kindling of bonfires upon superstitious nights vis Midsomer - Alhallowes", and "resorting to wells denominat of saints in a superstitious way for obtaining health to sick and distracted persons". "Those that observe Yule Day" are mentioned as superstitious persons who should mend their ways.

== The witch hunt ==
=== Prosecutions ===
The earliest known set of prosecutions for witchcraft in Inverkeithing took place between 1621 and 1623, and involved 21 women and 1 man. The first known investigation took place on 9th February 1621 and investigated Margaret Donaldsone. This was followed by the investigation of 7 more women on 23rd February 1621. The final investigations of this period took place on 28th March 1623.

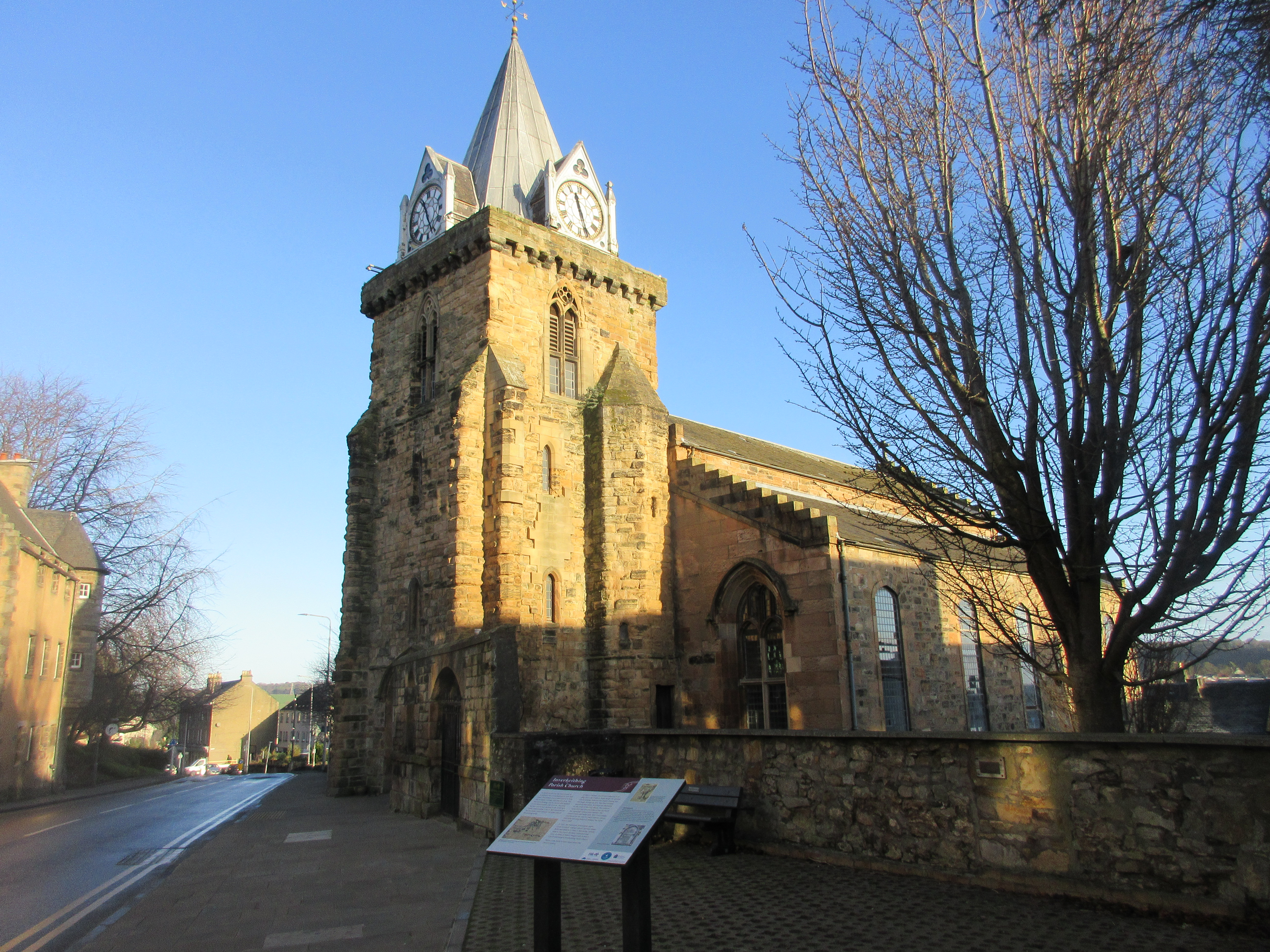
Inverkeithing Parish Church.

The second set of prosecutions for witchcraft took place in 1649. Walter Bruce in July 1649 accused at least 23 local Inverkeithing women, around 11% of the adult female population at the time. Some of these were the wives of the town magistrates, so Bruce had to enlist help from the presbetry of Dunfermline in apprehending the women. Margaret Henderson, Lady Pittadro, was named as the ringleader of the witches, however she died before her trial. It was unusual to have a woman of high status accused. 18 women were prosecuted for witchcraft. Historian Stuart MacDonald (1997) suggests these prosecutions could have been the catalyst for the Great Scottish Witch Hunt of 1649–1650.

Finally, Kathrene Smith was prosecuted for witchcraft on 1st January 1655, and was the final prosecution recorded in Inverkeithing.

=== Executions ===
At least 51 people were tried and executed for witchcraft in Inverkeithing, according to records of Inverkeithing Parish Church. These executions took place between 1621 and 1652. The method of execution used was strangling and burning.

The execution site was a small hill in the south of the town, which became known as witchknowe.

The 17th century Dunfermline Parish Annuls state: "witches still ride over Inverkeithing despite all the drooning and burning that's taken place in the toon".

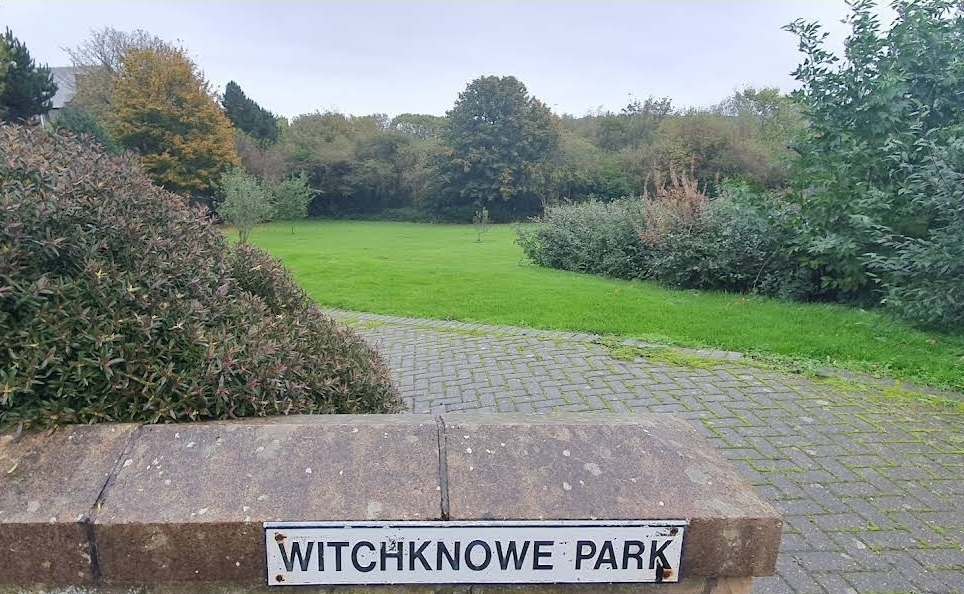
Witchknowe park, on the site of Witchknowe.

== Aftermath ==
Walter Bruce remained minister at Inverkeithing until his death in 1673.

The last mass execution for witchcraft was in Paisley in 1697, and the Scottish witch hunts were brought to a definitive end in 1736 when the British Parliament repealed the 1563 Scottish Witchcraft Act.

In 1698, church records at Inverkeithing show a group of people consulted a "wizard" to find the whereabouts of a web of cloth, and were charged before the Kirk session.

Witchknowe, the site of the executions, became Witchknowe park and Hope Street cemetery.
