= St John's Church, Inverkeithing =

Coordinates: 56.0338°N 3.3970°W

St John's Church
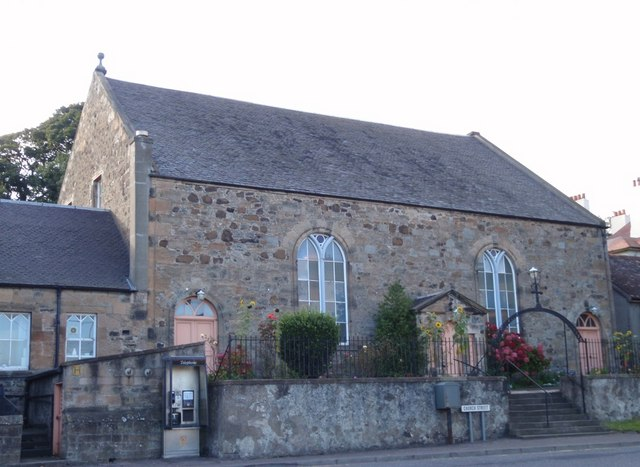
- St John's Church building (2009)
- Interactive map of St John's Church
- Location: Church Street, Inverkeithing

History
- Built: 1752

Listed Building – Category B
- Official name: 58, 60 Church Street, Inverkeithing Parish Church (St John's building; Church of Scotland) including adjoining hall and offices, boundary walls and railings
- Designated: 19 December 1979
- Reference no.: LB35113

St John's Church is a former church building in Inverkeithing in Fife, Scotland. Originally built in 1752 as a Burgher chapel, it is a Category B listed building, noted by Historic Scotland as playing "a significant part in the development of Inverkeithing's socio-religious history".

== History ==
In 1752 a split occurred within the congregation of Inverkeithing Parish Church over the choice of Andrew Richardson as minister by right of patronage; the dispute became known as the Inverkeithing Case. Following Richardson's eventual appointment as minister, 127 parishioners left, and St John's Church was built as a Burgher chapel.

Postcard of St Johns Church on Church Street, Inverkeithing. c. 1905.

With growing attendance, in 1799 the building was widened, heightened, and had galleries added. By the 1830s, the congregation at St John's Church comprised roughly half the burgh's population. The church was renovated in 1882.

On 4 August 2000, news crews were pitched outside St John's Church and Inverkeithing Parish Church after hints by HM Treasury that Gordon Brown and Sarah Macauley would be married at the local parish church in Inverkeithing. Brown and Macauley were instead married at their nearby home.

In 2006, St John's church was united with Inverkeithing Parish Church. The building was sold to a private buyer in 2022.

=== Incarnations ===
Founded as a Burger chapel, by 1779, a protracted dispute over the first minister of the Church led to a large part of the church becoming Cameronian. Later incarnations of the church are as follows:

- Associate Congregation c. 1786 - 1820
- United Associate (Secession) Congregation 1820 - 1847
- United Presbyterian Church 1847 - 1900
- United Free Church in 1900 - 1929
- Church of Scotland in 1929 - 2022.

== Ministers ==
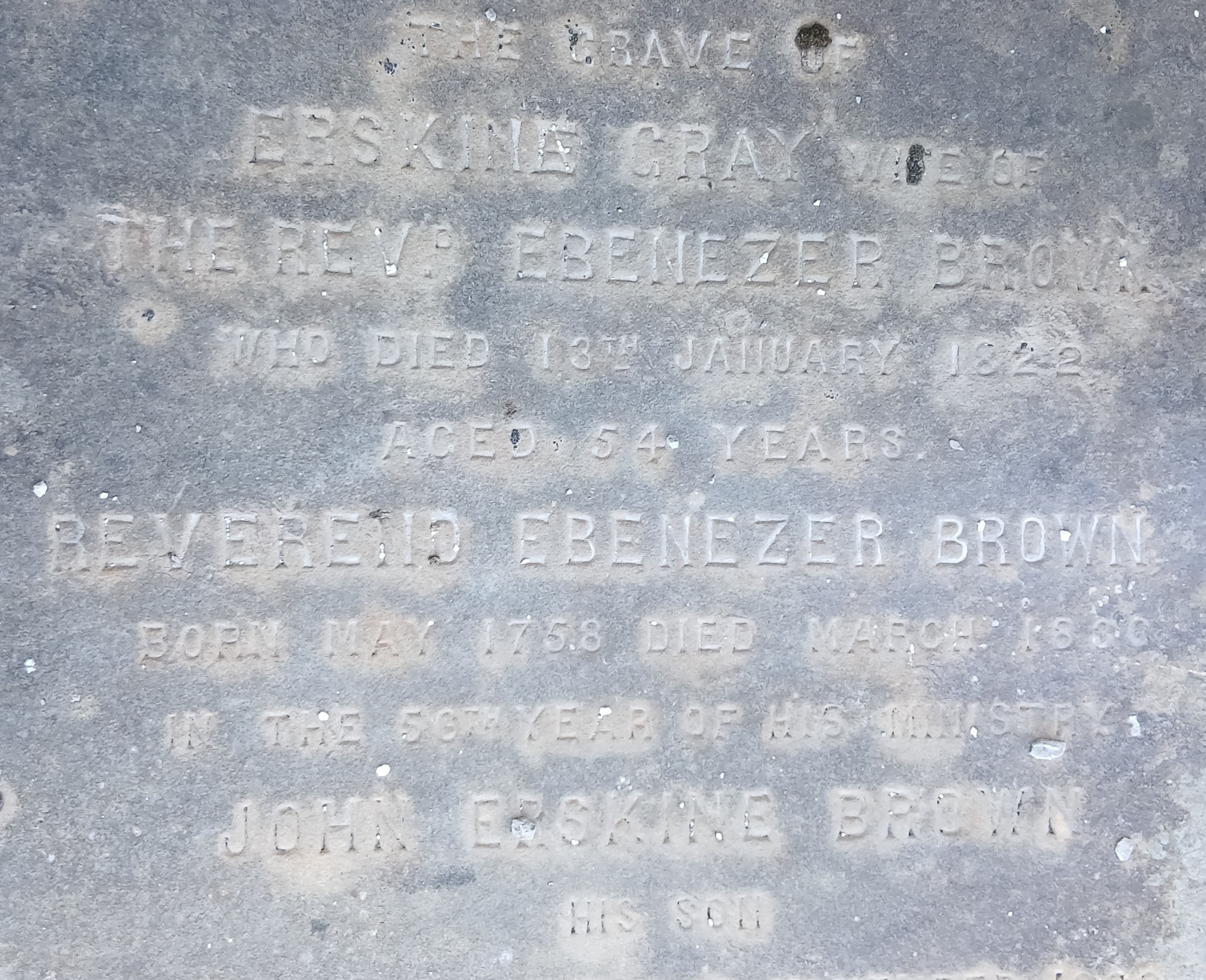
Gravestone of Rev. Ebeneezer Brown, Inverkeithing Parish Church cemetery.

Pulpit of St Johns Church, c. early 20th century.

The longest serving minister of St John's church was Reverend Ebenezer Brown, who served from 1780 to 1835. He was an early supporter of the missionary movement, and declined calls to ministry in Stirling in 1788, Aberdeen in 1798 and Glasgow in 1800.

The complete list of ministers is given:

- 1755-1772: David Forrest
- 1776-1778: Adam Selkirk
- 1780-1836: Ebenezer Brown
- 1835-1875: John Dick Fleming
- 1875-1892: Thomas Sclater
- 1893-1933: Peter C Bryce
- 1933-1936: David Herd
- 1937-1958: R. W. Anderson
- 1958-1962: D. C. Moir
- 1963-1970: H. J. G. Troup
- 1971-1976: Alexander Strickland
- 1977-1993: William G Baird
- 1995-2002: Sheila Munro
- 2004-2006: Chris Park

After 2006, St John's Church united with Inverkeithing Parish Church, with Chris Park taking over as joint minister.

== Listed Status ==
In December 1979, St John's Church was awarded category B listed status by Historic Scotland. In their statement of special interest, they note the church: "... plays a significant part in the development of Inverkeithing's socio-religious history, with particular relevance to its status as a royal burgh and reflects the staunchness of its citizens." and also that "apart from some internal improvements, this church has not changed significantly since its major additions of the late 18th century."
