= Scottish Catholic-Culdee dispute of 1250 =

The Scottish Catholic-Culdee dispute of 1250 was an ecclesiastical controversy between Culdees and Roman Catholics that began in St Andrews, Fife, and culminated in a scheduled meeting in Inverkeithing Parish Church on 7 November 1250 ruled over by Robert de Keldeleth, Lord Chancellor of Scotland, where the Culdees failed to attend.

The result of the dispute and the failure of the Culdees to attend was significant: facing local expulsion, the Culdees later ceased to exist as a distinct religious body. The ruling in the dispute affirmed and furthered the primacy of Roman Catholicism within Scottish religious affairs, which would continue until the Scottish Reformation.

== Background ==
The Culdees were an ancient order of Celtic Christian monks and ascetics who flourished in Scotland and Ireland from the 8th to the 14th centuries. Their name comes from the Gaelic Céli Dé, which translates roughly to "Companions of God" or "Servants of God".

From the 11th century, Scottish monarchs, most notably Queen Margaret and David I, began integrating churches in Scotland towards Roman Catholicism.

== The dispute ==
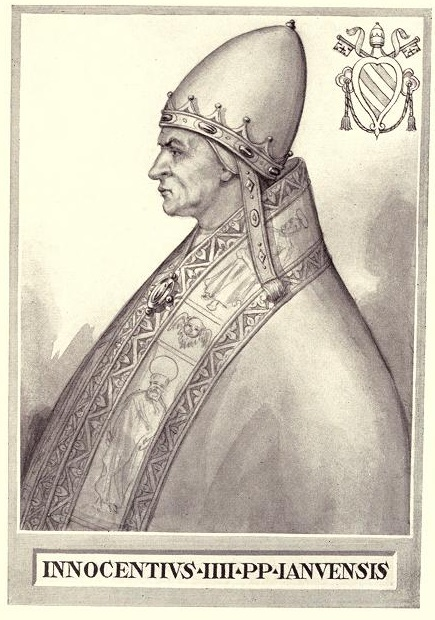
Pope Innocent IV by Chevalier Artaud de Montor (1842).

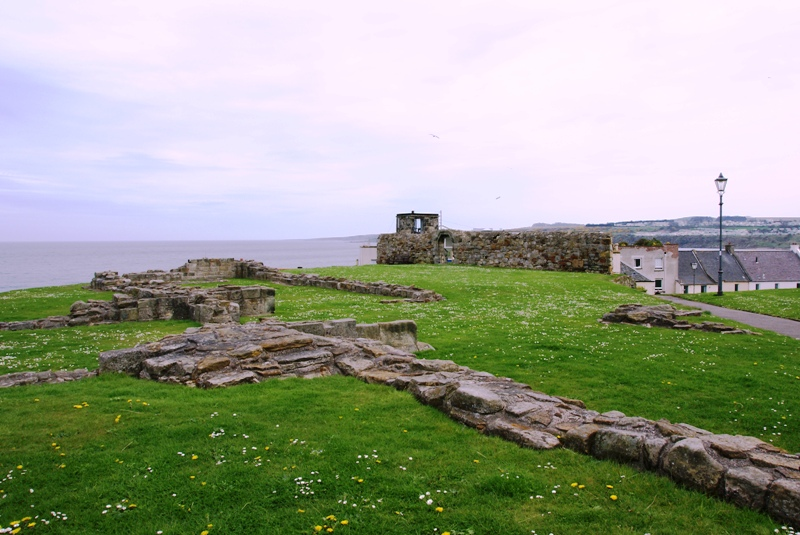
Ruins of St Mary's Church, St Andrews.

The dispute began in St Andrews in Fife, Scotland. The prior and convent of St Andrews appealed to Pope Innocent IV for precedency and superiority over St Mary's Church in St Andrews. The Culdees denied this, stating their prior, Adam Malkiwistun, was provost of the Church, and they themselves were the canons.

Pope Innocent IV delegated the priors of St Oswald and Kyrkham in England to enquire and abjudicate. Having delegates from another Kingdom, he believed, would ensure impartiality. The delegates found the Culdees in the wrong, and in the mean time suspended them from their office. However they but delayed to pronounce their final sentence until 7 November 1250. At this date they intended to enquire whether the Culdees had in the mean time celebrated divine ordinances, while they were thus under ecclesiastical censure.

=== The meeting at Inverkeithing ===
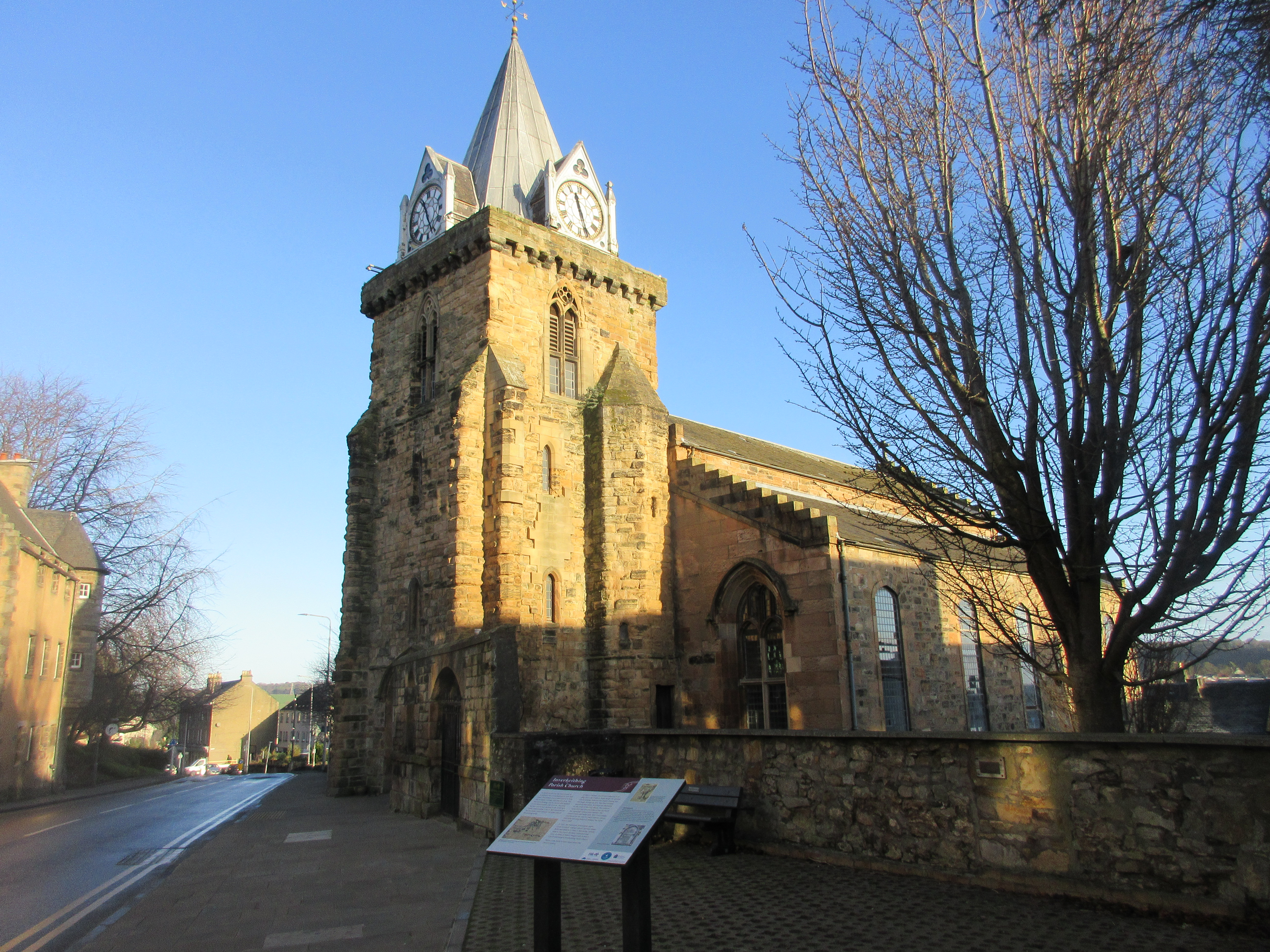
Inverkeithing Parish Church, the site of the meeting of 7 November 1250.

The meeting of 7 November 1250 was held at Inverkeithing Parish Church in Inverkeithing, Scotland, and by this time had reached national importance. The Culdees did not attend the meeting. Nevertheless, for the final sentence, the verdict was pronounced by Robert de Keldeleth, Lord Chancellor of Scotland, Abbot of Dunfermline, and chaplain of the Pope, as well as Sir Robert, treasurer of the church of Dunkeld. Church records of the day are as follows (English translation from Latin):

In the parish church of Inverkeithing (FIF), on the morrows of St Leonard, A.D. 1250, in the presence of Robert, lord abbot of Dunfermline, chaplain of the lord pope and chancellor of the lord king of Scotland, and Sir Robert, treasurer of the church of Dunkeld, by apostolic authority between the lord prior and convent of St Andrews on one side, and Master Adam of Makerston, acting as provost of the city of St Andrews, and the Céli De acting as canons, and their vicars on the other. The aforesaid day was made available for the public settlement upheld by the priors of St Oswald and Kirkham for Master Adam of Makerston, Richard Veyrement, William Wischard, Robert de l’Isle, Patrick of Muckhart, Michael Ruffus, Michael Niger, and any other Céli De acting as canons, and other disobedients and rebels of the church of St Mary of St Andrews, and for the enquiries of whether the said Céli De and the vicars had celebrated divine services as bound, and for the statues which the canons shall be under premise. The said abbot and treasurer have published this sentence of the said priors of St Oswald and Kirkham concerning the inquisition made; they have admitted witnesses, and have made this be recorded. They have also made available Saturday, after the feast of St Andrews in the church of the Friars Preachers of Perth for the publication of the attestations, for the calling together of witnesses and testimonies and for proceeding according to the papal mandate. The said judges are permitted to inflict a just penalty upon the said provost and the Céli De on account of their contumacy, and also to postpone up to the said day.

The Culdees were found to be in the wrong; their sentence was expulsion. This sentence was deferred for a short time due to their non attendance.

== Legacy ==
According to Robert Sibbald (1710), having faced expulsion in St Andrews following the Scottish Catholic-Culdees dispute of 1250, the Culdees, as a distinct body of worshipper, ceased to exist. In his History of Fife (1710), he writes: "the religious controversy which had long subsisted between those who held to the Culdee form of worship and those who adhered to Rome, was this year [1250] settled".

The final record of Culdees in St Andrews is as a "[...] small college of highly-placed secular clerks closely connected with the Bishop and the King", and is dated 1332.

The resolution of the dispute affirmed and furthered the primacy of Roman Catholicism within Scottish religious affairs, which would continue until the Scottish Reformation.
