= Gurley-Westall duel =

1824 pistol duel in Fife, Scotland

The Gurley–Westall duel was a pistol duel fought on 30 October 1824 on the Ferry Hills, near North Queensferry in Fife, Scotland, between Captain William Gurley of Petershope and John Westall (also spelled Waistell). Gurley was fatally wounded and died at the scene. It was one of the last duels fought in Scotland.

== Background ==
Captain William Gurley of Petershope was born in 1783 and belonged to the Gurley family, owners of ‘Peter’s Hope’ estate in St Patrick parish, St Vincent, which had been established around 1765. Gurley inherited his father's St Vincent properties in 1810, while he was stationed with the 51st Aberdeen Militia at Berwick-upon-Tweed. He left the militia in 1811, and was married in Berwick-upon-Tweed on 21 April 1813 to Elizabeth Marsh. In 1824 the family moved to Edinburgh so that Gurley could more easily attend to matters concerning his estate in St Vincent.

John Westall was a lace representative from London.

The quarrel between Gurley and Waistell began in September 1824, when Westall refused to pay Gurley money he owed after losing a bet at the St. Leger Stakes in Doncaster.

The pair met again in the Black Bull Inn, Edinburgh on 26 October 1824. After a fight, the pair agreed to a duel. They originally chose the morning of 30 October at Arthur’s Seat, however had to cancel as the area was patrolled by police.

On the same day, 30 October, they arranged to meet at Ferryhills in Fife.

== The duel ==
Memorial on the spot of Gurley's death during the Gurley-Westall duel, Ferryhills, Fife.

On 30 October 1824 the duel took place on the Ferry Hills, north of North Queensferry. Westall fatally wounded Gurley, who died at the scene. Westall survived.

== Aftermath ==
After the duel, Gurley's body was rested at Signal House, North Queensferry, under a Union Jack.

Gurley was buried a few days after the duel, interred in the burial ground of Francis Henderson of Cruicks in Inverkeithing Parish Church kirkyard, in Inverkeithing. His broken marble tombstone is retained by the church.

A notice of Gurley's death appeared in the December 1824 issue (page 768) of the Edinburgh Magazine and Literary Miscellany.

The Gurley-Westall duel marks one of the last in Scotland, the very final duel being in 1826 at Kirkcaldy.

In the 19th century, a whinstone pillar was erected to mark the duel place; in 1987, North Queensferry council added a brass memorial plaque with the inscription:

"It is on record that Captain Wm Gurley of Petershope, St. Vincent, died at this spot on 30th October, 1824, having been fatally wounded in a pistol duel with Mr Westall, the last fought in Fife – North Queensferry Community Council 1987".
