= St Erat =

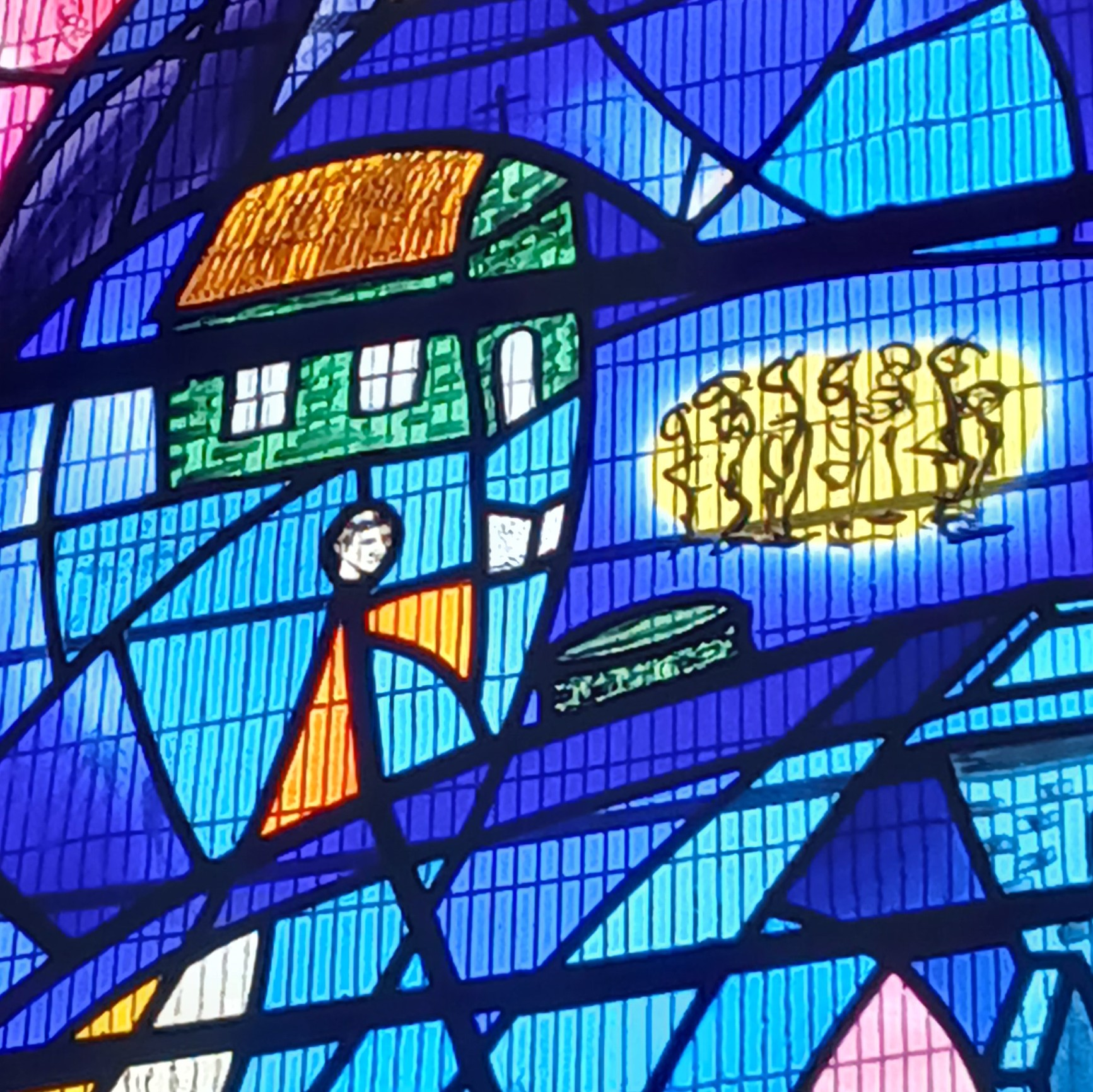
- Stained glass of Inverkeithing Parish Church depicting St Erat preaching in front of his early wooden church and well in Inverkeithing.
- Born: c. 5th century
- Residence: Inverkeithing

St Erat (also recorded as St Heriot) was, according to tradition, a 5th-century holy man notable for bringing Christianity to Inverkeithing in Fife, Scotland.

== Life ==
Tradition suggests St Erat was born in the 5th century AD. St Erat is said to have been a follower of St Ninian, an early missionary among the Pictish peoples of what is now Scotland.

In Stephen's The Story of Inverkeithing and Rosyth (1938), he notes:

St Erat... occurs in Fife as St Erhad, Erthad or Erthat. The Fife forms in turn are regarded as dialectic adaptations of St Yrchard, who, a native of Kincardine O'Neil and a convert of St Ternan, the Ninianic Missionary, flourished in the period 450-500 AD.

St Erat is said to have established the first church in Inverkeithing around 500AD, on the site of the current Inverkeithing Parish Church.

Drawing of the likely appearance of St Erat's Church, c. 500 - 700.

== Dedications ==
A chapel on the grounds of Fordell Castle has been dedicated to St Erat since at least 1511.

An ancient well, formerly known as St Erat's well, stands in Heriot Street (after St Theriot, an orthographic variation of St Erat).

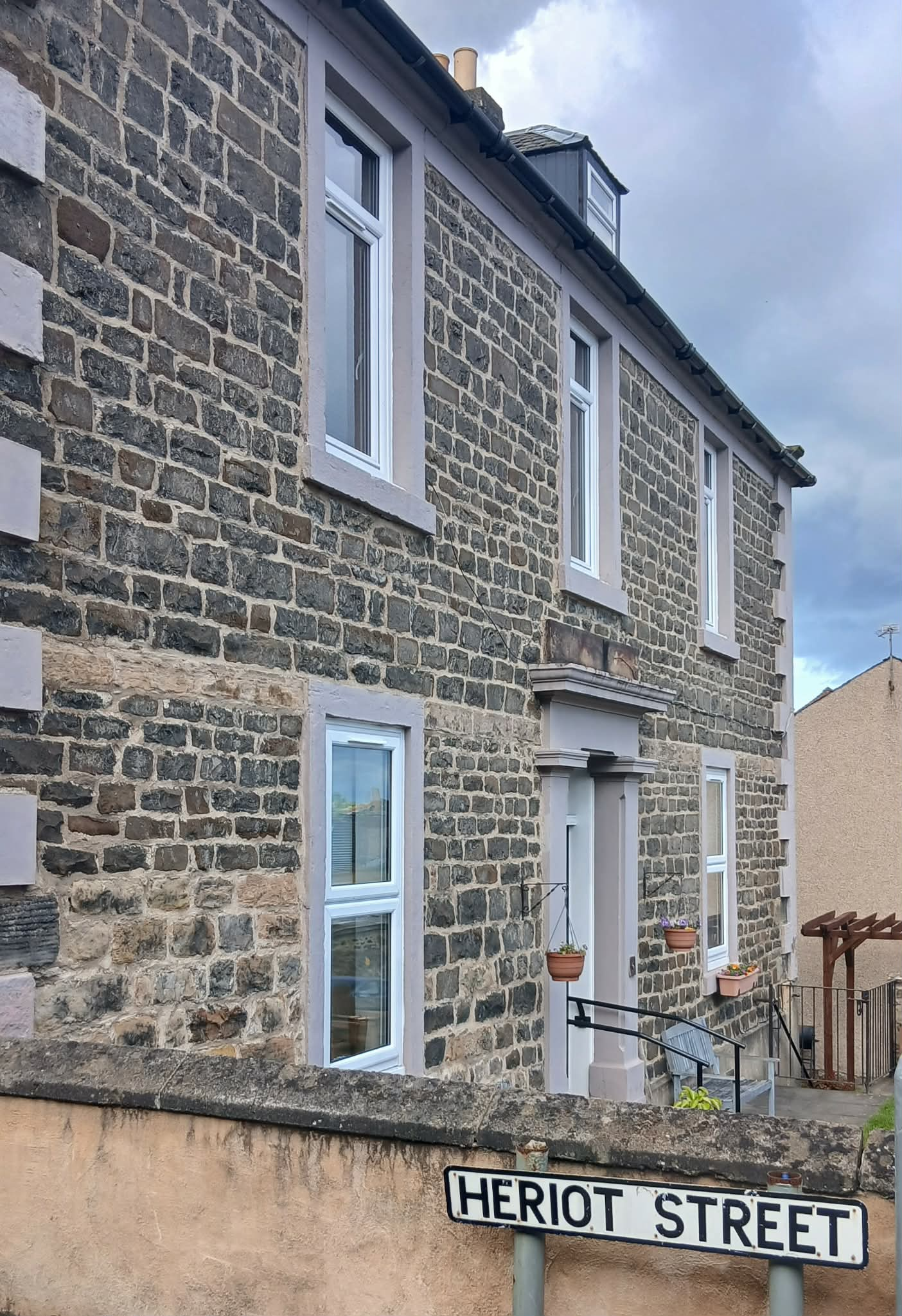
Heriot Street Sign south, Inverkeithing.

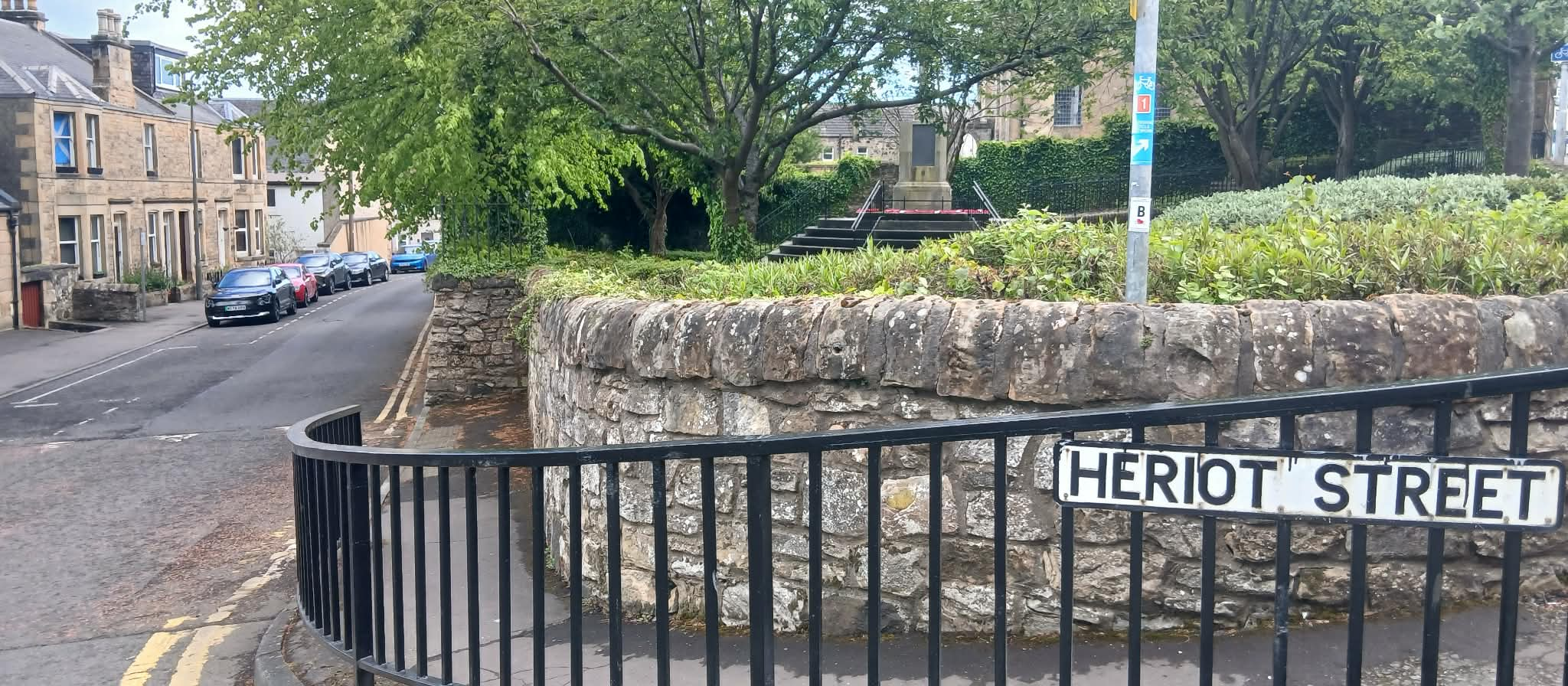
Heriot Street sign north, Inverkeithing.

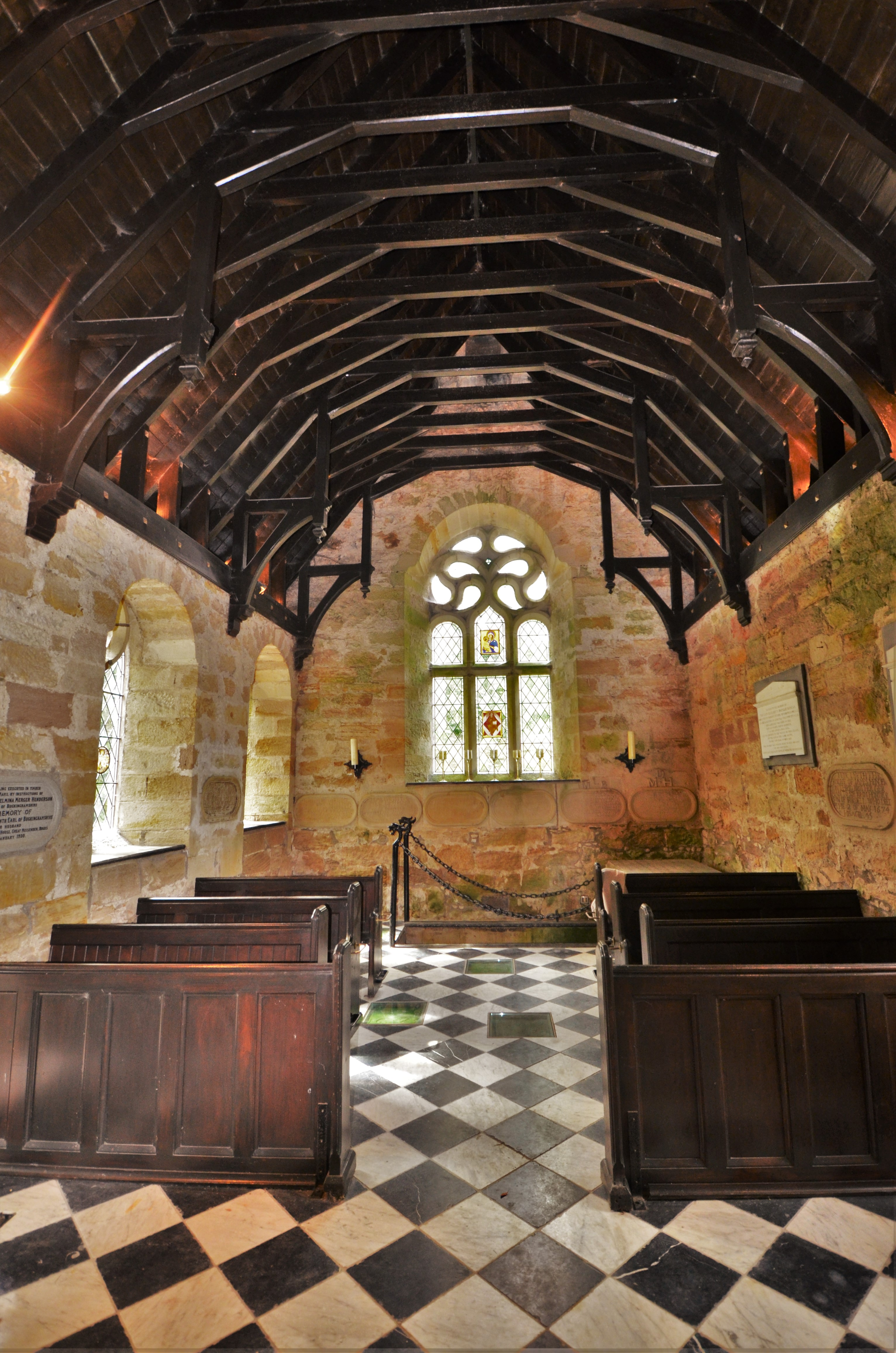
Chapel dedicated to St Erat on the grounds of Fordell Castle.

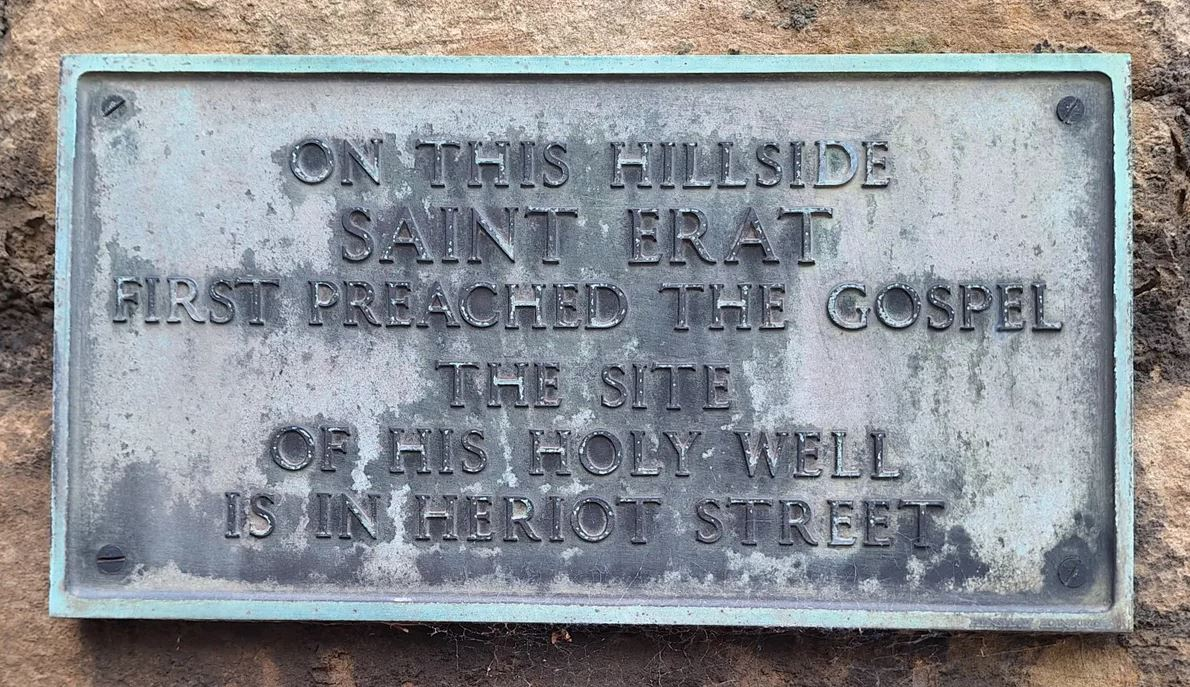
Dedication plaque to St Erat on Inverkeithing Parish Church.

== Historicity ==
The first written references to St Erat are in a sasine of 1588, which makes reference to St Erat's well. The well is first recorded in a charter of 1219. The form St Herriot appears in 1686.

In the late 19th century, tradition seems to have developed that St Erat arrived in Inverkeithing in the 5th century, as well as his connections with St Ninian.

The ancient well, and a chapel at nearby Fordell, are the only recorded dedications to St Erat or Heriot in Scotland; and there are no contemporary documents nor archaeological evidence that confirm the local tradition.

Inverkeithing Parish Church has a dedication plaque commemorating St Erat's founding of the first church in Inverkeithing.
