= Witchknowe Park =

Park in Fife, Scotland

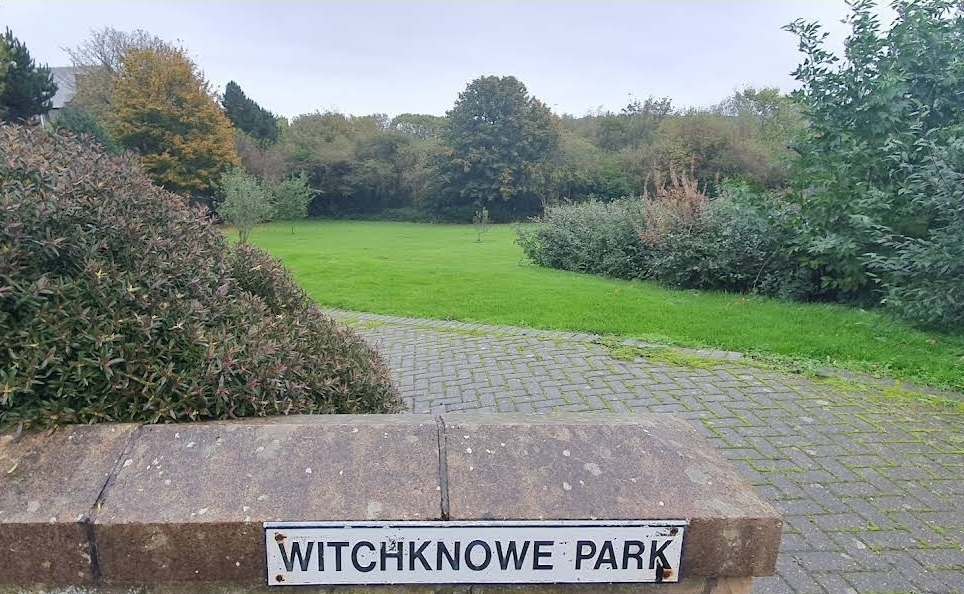
- Entrance from Hope Street
- Interactive map of Witchknowe Park
- Type: Parkland
- Location: Inverkeithing, Fife, Scotland
- Coordinates: 56.025342°N 3.402687°W
- Operator: Fife Council
- Open: 24/7

Witchknowe Park is a historic site in Inverkeithing in Fife, Scotland. Notable as the place of execution for so-called witches in the 17th century, the site is now a landscaped public park.

== History ==
In the 17th century, dozens of so-called witches were likely burned alive at Witch knowe. According to records at Inverkeithing Parish Church, at least 51 people were tried and executed for witchcraft in Inverkeithing between 1621 and 1652. The site of witch knowe was both the current Witchknowe park and Hope Street Cemetery.

The word Witchknowe is a reference to the executions of people accused of witchcraft and the hilly topography of the site, known as a knowe in the Scots language.

During the Victorian era, much of the park was built on. In 1902, a section of Witchknowe park was taken for the erection of St Peter's Episcopal Church.
