= Ebenezer Brown (minister) =

Ebenezer Brown (1758–1836) from the National Galleries of Scotland.

Ebenezer Brown (May 1758 - March 1836) was a secessionist Scottish minister.

An early supporter of the Scottish missionary movement, Brown served as minister of St John's Church in Inverkeithing, Fife, between 1780 and his death in 1836. Brown inspired Robert Moffat, Scottish missionary and the first to translate the bible into an African language.

== Early life ==
Ebenezer Brown was born in May 1758. His father was John Brown of Haddington, minister, religious scholar and the author of the "self interpreting bible". He was ordained a minister of the succession church before the age of 22.

== Ministership ==
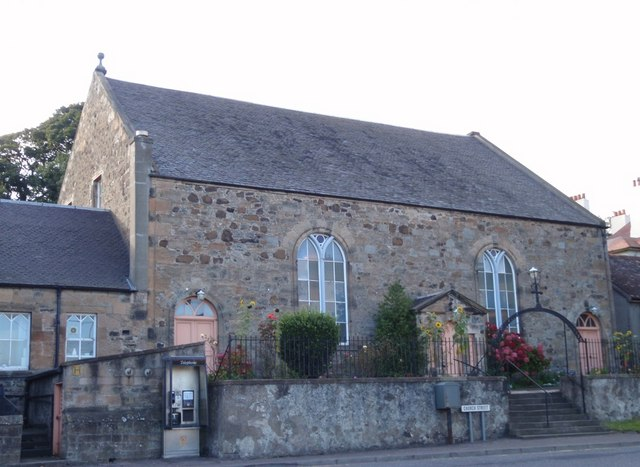
St John's Church, Inverkeithing.

In 1779, the ministership of St John's Church, Inverkeithing, became open following the death of minister Adam Selkirk. Ebenezer Brown served as minister from 1780 to 1836, the longest serving minister in the church's history.

In Cunningham (1889), writing of his younger days, Brown is described as:

"A sweet, a saintly solemnity overspread his aspect as he stood up to minister before the assembly, and while he preached the tidings of mercy, his look, his voice, his whole appearance, were like this of one who, having himself tested that the Lord was gracious, had now every thought absorbed in holy earnestness that others also might partake of the divine salvation".

Brown was an early supporter of the missionary movement. He preached to the London Missionary Society in May 1800. In 1823 he made an appeal for the support of Christian Indian ministers, claiming:

"It is comfortable to hear that a considerable number of our fellow subjects in the east Indies have been brought to faith in Jesus; and that some of them, with much advantage, have been employed as preachers. Many more, we are credibly informed, might be thus engaged, were there sufficient funds to support them. The employment of native missionaries has many recommendations".

In 1830, a letter shows Brown asking church officials in British Guyana for a 'native teacher' to be dispatched for the East Indies. Brown was an inspiration to Robert Moffat, a parishioner of St John's Church under Brown. Moffat would become an influential figure in Scottish missionary and became the first to translate the bible into an African language.

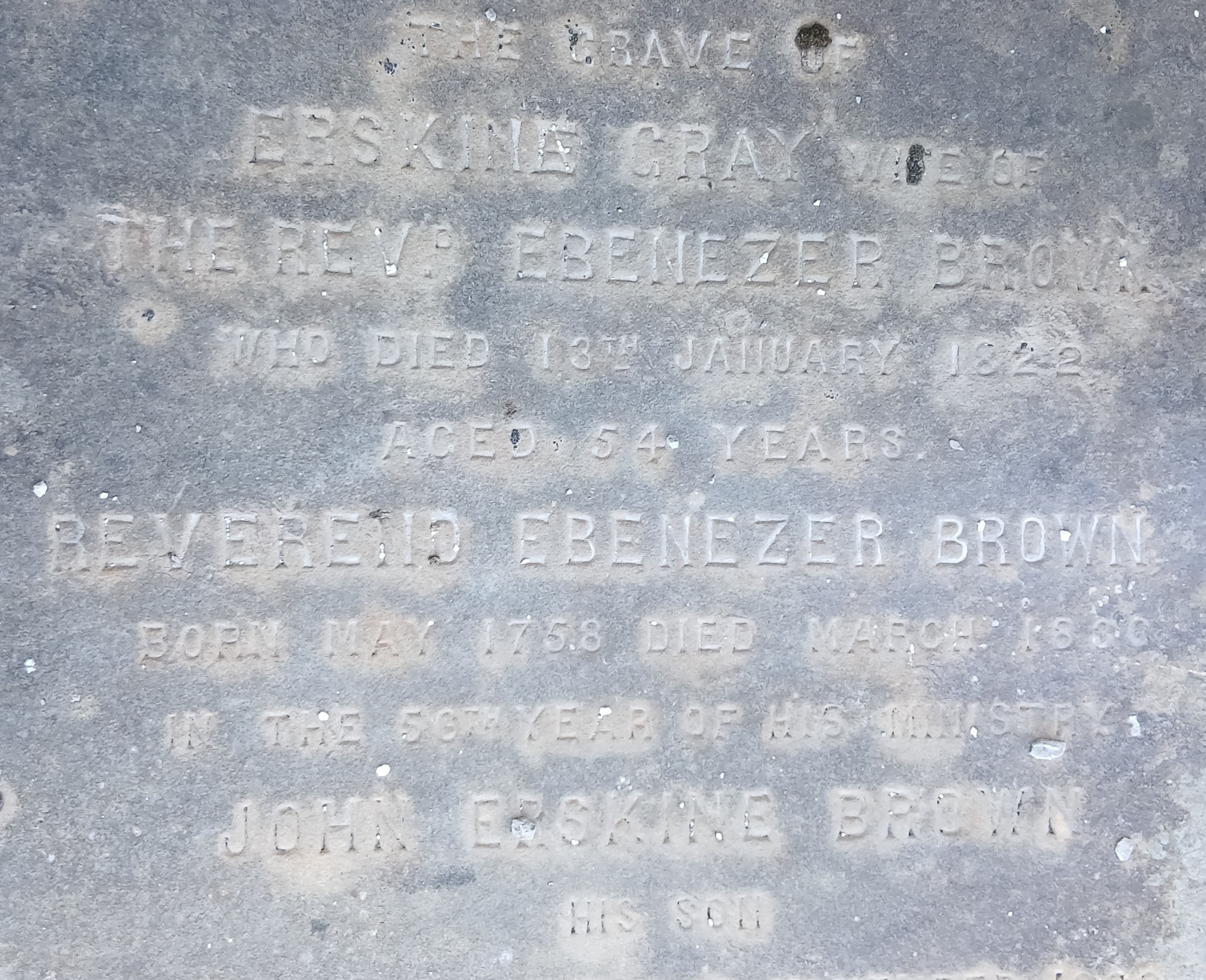
Ebenezer Brown's gravestone, Inverkeithing Parish Church kirkyard.

A popular minister, he resisted calls to ministry in Stirling in 1788, Aberdeen in 1798 and Glasgow in 1800.

== Death ==
Brown died in March 1836, and is said to have died "on sleep". He was buried in Inverkeithing Parish Church kirkyard. His memorial at St John's Church, Inverkeithing, reads:

This tablet is erected by his congregation to record their grateful recollection of his great piety, unwearied labours, natural eloquence, simplicity of manners, zeal for the instruction of the young and for the spread of the gospel throughout the world; and to excite to the imitation of his example: that when the Chief Shepherd shall appear and give to him a crown of glory, they also may find mercy.
