= Inverkeithing Parish Church font =

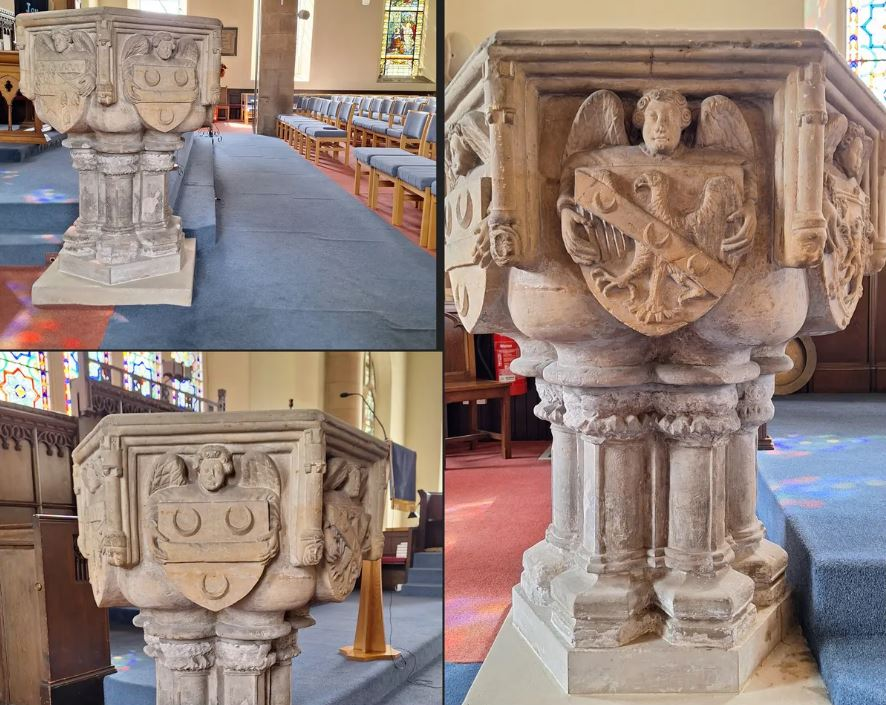
- Inverkeithing Parish Church font
- Material: Sandstone
- Created: c. 1398
- Discovered: 1807; Inverkeithing Parish Church foundations
- Present location: Inverkeithing Parish Church, Inverkeithing, Fife

The Inverkeithing Parish Church font dates from 1398, and was a gift to Inverkeithing Parish Church by Queen Annabella Drummond, the consort of King Robert III. According to Historic Scotland, it is considered to be one of the finest medieval furnishings to survive in any Scottish parish church.

== History ==
The font is an hexagonal bowl decorated with angels holding heraldic shields, and was gifted to Inverkeithing Parish Church in 1398 by Annabella Drummond, consort to Robert III. It is believed to have been gifted for the baptism of their first son, David, Earl of Carrick, later the first Duke of Rothesay: the title still adopted by the Royal heir apparent when in Scotland. It was originally coloured.

The font was concealed, likely at the time of the Reformation.

=== Rediscovery ===
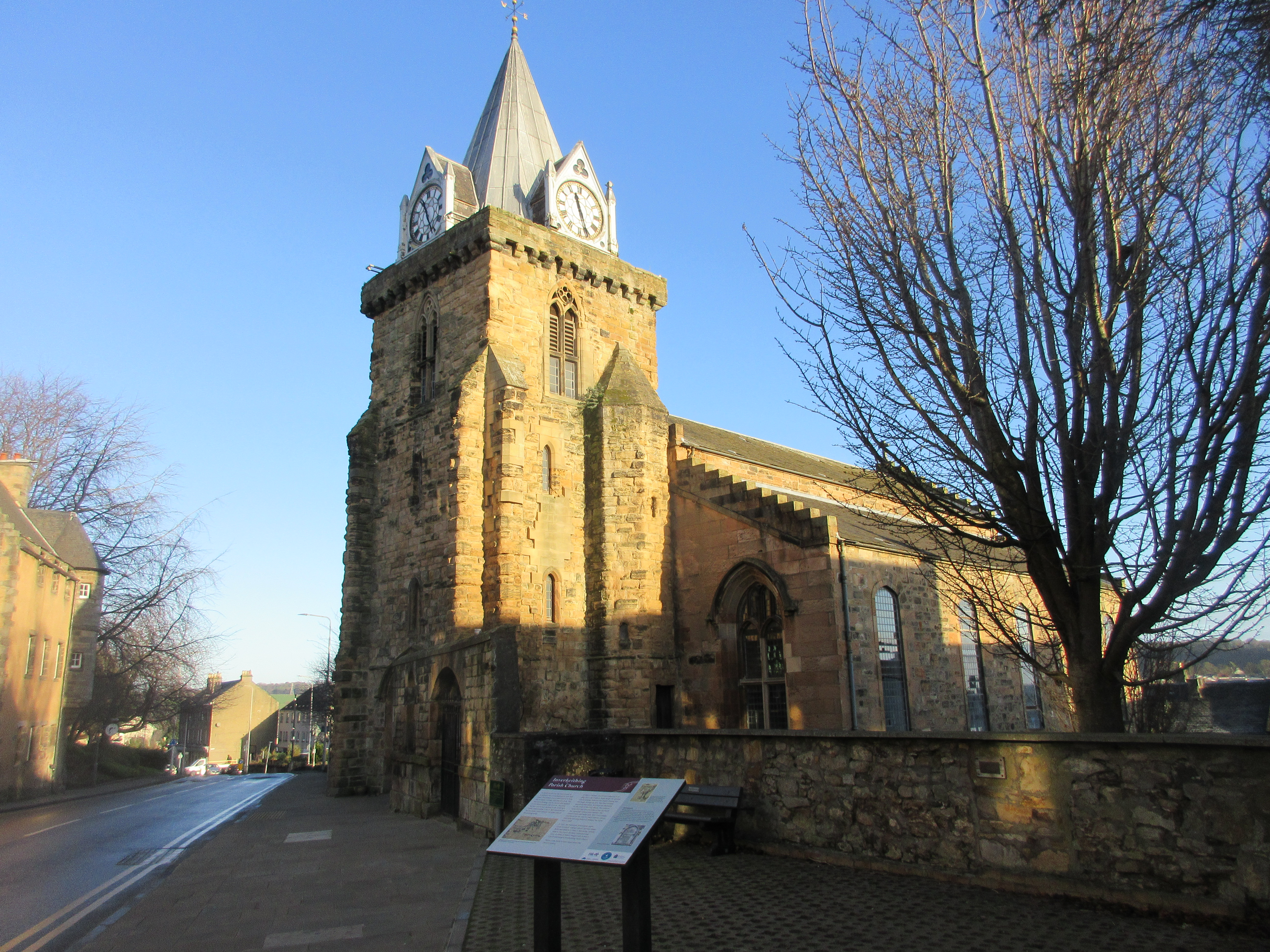
Inverkeithing Parish Church.

The font was rediscovered in 1807 buried in straw under the vestibule of the church, along with the presumed relics of a saint.

1883 sketch of Inverkeithing Parish Church font, front elevation.

1883 sketch of Inverkeithing Parish Church font, top elevation and shields.

== Coats of Arms ==
The font bears the following coats of arms:

- The Royal Arms of Scotland
- The Stuart family arms
- The Drummond family arms
- Coat of arms of Bruce of Balkaskie
- Coat of arms of Ramsay of Denoun
- Coat of arms of Melville of Glenbervie
