= Inverkeithing case =

The Inverkeithing case was a significant ecclesiastical dispute in Scotland in 1752 around the issue of patronage.

The outcome of the case asserted the authority of both the Moderate Party and the system of patronage within the Church of Scotland, and resulted in the deposition of Thomas Gillespie and the later establishment of the Relief Church.

== Background ==
The system of patronage was restored in Scotland 1712 under the Church Patronage (Scotland) Act 1711. Under this system, when a vacancy opened for a ministership, a patron (usually a local landowner or noble) would nominate (present) a candidate. The local church court (the presbytery) would examine him, and provided he met basic standards, he was usually installed: even if the local congregation objected.

Politics within the Church of Scotland in the 18th century was often divided between two parties. The Moderate Party supported church order and authority, the system of patronage, and were associated with the Scottish Enlightenment. The Popular Party believed in the right of congregations, personal faith and were opposed to the system of patronage.

== The dispute ==
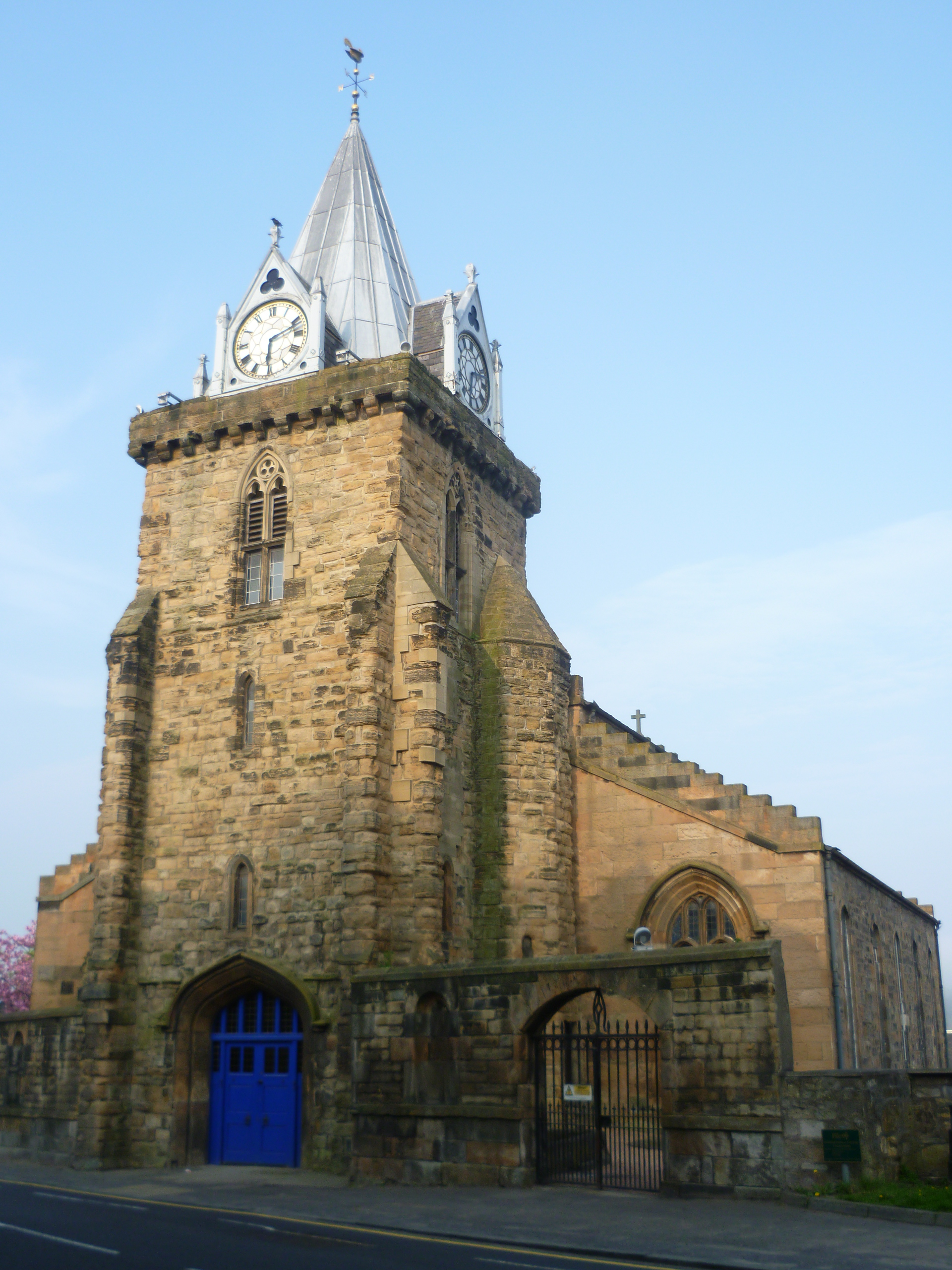
Inverkeithing Parish Church.

On 8th March 1749, the position of minister of the parish of Inverkeithing, in Fife, became vacant upon the death of Rev. Allan Buchanan, who was ordained in 1744 and who died at 27. The patron of Inverkeithing parish, Captain Philip Anstruther, had nominated Andrew Richardson, the minister of Broughton. The local congregation strongly opposed Richardson's appointment.

The Presbytery of Dunfermline delayed appointing Richardson out of respect of the wishes of the congregation.

Following an appeal on behalf of Richardson, the case went to the Synod of Fife. From there, it went to the General Assembly's Commission, which ruled that Richardson's appointment was valid and should proceed. Despite this, the Presbytery of Dunfermline refused to carry out Richardson's appointment.

In November 1751, the General Assembly's Commission ordered the Presbytery of Dunfermline to comply. They warned that if Richardson was not installed by March, they should then have recourse “to very high censure.”

In March 1752, the General Assembly's Commission unexpectedly accepted the Presbytery's excuses for delay. Instead of punishing the Presbytery of Dunfermline, they dropped the threat of discipline and transferred responsibility for installing Richardson to the Synod of Fife. The Synod refused to carry out the task, on account that it had been unfairly burdened.

A group of 7 ministers and 8 elders, led by William Robertson and associated with the Moderate Party, strongly disagreed with the leniency shown by the General Assembly's Commission. They published a protest in The Scots Magazine, "Reasons for Dissent", effectively turning the issue into a public controversy.

=== The General Assembly of 1752 ===
The Inverkeithing Case came before the General Assembly of the Church of Scotland in 1752 after complaints from those protesting the General Assembly's Commission's leniency and those in favour of Richardson's appointment.

John Cuming, leader of the Moderate party, was re-elected Moderator of The General Assembly. On May 18, the Assembly acted decisively:

- It cleared the Synod of Fife of blame, saying the commission had overstepped its authority.
- It ordered the Presbytery of Dunfermline to meet at Inverkeithing to install Richardson.
- The minimum number of ministers required (the quorum) was raised from 3 to 5, making it harder for opponents to block proceedings.
- All ministers involved were ordered to appear and explain themselves.

Upon examining ministers involved in dissenting the orders of the General Assembly's Commission, the Assembly then voted (93 to 65) that one of the dissenting ministers must be removed from office (deposed).

=== Outcome ===
Thomas Gillespie was chosen for deposition on May 22, 1752. This was likely because he took a leading role in resisting and had connections to English Independent religious groups. To his sentence his response was: "I rejoice that to me it is given, in the behalf of Christ, not only to believe on Him, but also to suffer for His sake."

Richardson was finally appointed minister of Inverkeithing in June 1752.

Three ministers who still refused to participate in the installation of Richardson were punished: for 13 years, they were not allowed to take part in higher church courts.

== Legacy ==
The Inverkeithing Case had shown the Church of Scotland prioritised institutional and legal order over congregational consent, and asserted the authority of the Moderate Party.

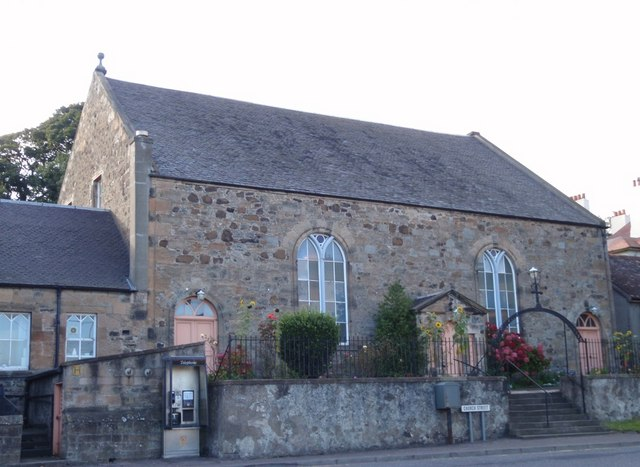
St John's Church, Inverkeithing founded as a Burgher chapel in 1752.

Following the appointment of Richardson, 127 Inverkeithing parishioners left the Church of Scotland and founded St John's Church as a Burgher chapel.

In 1753, John Hyndman published "A Just View of the Constitution of the Church of Scotland" which was critical of Thomas Gillespie and those who did not follow the directions of the General Assembly in the Inverkeithing Case.

John Witherspoon wrote the satirical pamphlet Ecclesiastical Characteristics (1753) largely in response to the Inverkeithing Case. His work viewed Church actions in the Inverkeithing Case as a violation of religious liberty and congregational rights.

The Inverkeithing Case is considered the leading cause of the Second Secession of the Church of Scotland to the Relief Church, which was founded in 1761 by Thomas Gillespie and other sympathetic ministers to provide relief from patronage. The first Relief Presbytery was formed Oct. 22, 1761, and the first congregation was established in Colinsburgh in Fife. The Relief Church quickly expanded in congregation, and had a notable history: as the first in Scotland to introduce the hymn book into public worship, to sponsor the cause of foreign missions, and to take a definite stand against the slave trade.
