= Inverkeithing Civic Centre =

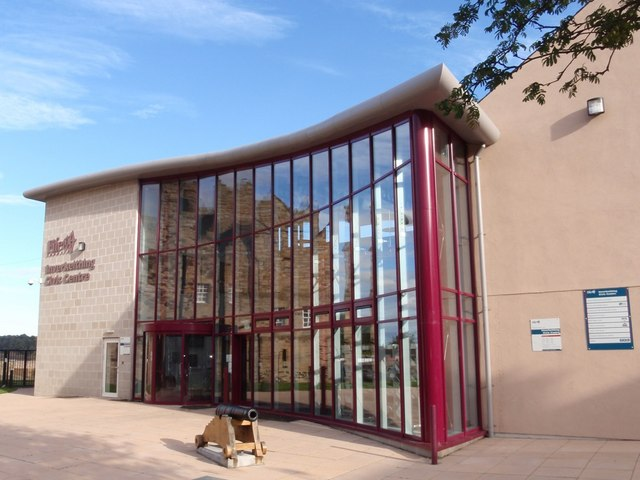
- Inverkeithing Civic Centre, as viewed from Queen Street.

History
- Built: 1960-62; renovated 2008

Site notes
- Architect(s): Sir Frank Mears & Partners

Inverkeithing Civic Centre is a municipal building in the town of Inverkeithing in Fife, Scotland.

== History ==
Inverkeithing town hall had served municipal functions in Inverkeithing since 1755, but by the mid 20th century Inverkeithing's population had grown from 1,684 in 1755 to 5,139 in 1951. A modern, larger municipal building was needed.

Inverkeithing civic centre was built between 1960 - 1962 by Sir Frank Mears and Partners (under the direction of R J Naismith), who were also was responsible for much of the modern urban architecture of the burgh. It was opened by the Secretary of State for Scotland in 1962.

The building was extensively renovated in 2008, and was re opened on 28 October 2008 by John Swinney MSP, serving as Finance Secretary of Scotland.

Inverkeithing Civic centre, c. 1970's.

Reopening dedication by John Swinney MSP.

== Current Functions ==
Cafe of Inverkeithing Civic Centre, overlooking the Firth of Forth.

As well as performing council functions, Inverkeithing civic centre has a library and heritage centre. The building hosts community use sports, has meeting rooms and a café. The civic centre hosts events in music and comedy.

== Heritage permanent collection ==
The civic centre has a permanent collection of historic artefacts related with the royal Burgh of Inverkeithing (2026).

18th century portrait of Samuel Grieg, father of the Russian navy born and raised in Inverkeithing.

Inverkeithing's Provost 9ct gold chain, c. 1911.

1559 carved stone, found re-used in a building of the 18th century.

The Last Mooring of the Ajax by David William Gunn (1927), oil on canvas.

"Two Brothers of Inverkeithing" commemorative jug, c. 1810.

Oil painting of Captain James Scott (1767-1850), master of the Queensferry passage.

Naval shields from boats moored or decommissioned in Inverkeithing.

1810 silver plaque commemorating loss of life on the sinking of the boat "Two Brothers of Inverkeithing".
