= Alexander Stoddart Wilson =

Alexander Stoddart Wilson (1854–1909) was a Scottish minister of the Free Church of Scotland who was also a scientist, serving as interim Professor of Botany at Glasgow University.

== Life ==
The grave of Wilson, Inverkeithing Cemetery

He was born in Glasgow in 1853. He was the son of Alexander Wilson (1810-1891) Free Church minister of Bridgeton.

He studied Science at Glasgow University. From around 1873 he served as interim Professor of Botany at Glasgow University also lecturing in botany at other colleges: Anderson's College; West of Scotland Technical College and St Margaret's College. His period as interim professor seems to have been necessitated to cover a prolonged field trip by Alexander Dickson.

Around 1878 he began retraining as a Free Church minister at the Free Church College in Glasgow and he was ordained at North Queensferry in 1881.

His parish became swamped by construction workers in 1882 when the construction of the Forth Rail Bridge began. A separate mission hall was built to accommodate the several hundred workers working on the north side of the Firth of Forth. He recruited an assistant missionary (Captain Elder) to help in this task, which included lectures in temperance. During the eight years that they worked on the bridge certainly some of these new parishioners were amongst the 57 fatalities on the bridge. The workforce left in 1890 as suddenly as they had arrived and the mission hall became redundant.

During his period at North Queensferry he appears to have continued his Monday to Friday role as a lecturer in Glasgow (this was very unusual). In 1885 he is listed as the founder of the Andersonian Naturalists Society.

A new manse was built for him in 1890.

Following the Union of 1900 he transferred to the United Free Church of Scotland.

He died in Inverkeithing on 8 February 1909. He is buried in Hope Street Cemetery, Inverkeithing. The broken grave lies on the north boundary wall.

== Family ==
In 1882 he married Elizabeth Blackadder Somerville (d. 1942). They had two children: Daniel Somerville, who accidentally drowned at Killin in 1910, and Elizabeth Helen (d. 1933).

== Publications ==
- Dispersion of Seeds (1888)
