= John Smart Peddie =

Scottish physician (1816–1848)

John Smart Peddie Esq.
- Born: 31 January 1816
- Disappeared: 1848; King William Island, Canada
- Died: c. 1848 (aged 31–32)
- Spouse: Eliza Matilda
- Children: 1
- Military career
- Branch: Royal Navy
- Rank: Assistant Surgeon
- Known for: Surgeon during the Franklin expedition of HMS Terror (1813)

John Smart Peddie (1816–1848) was a Scottish physician from Inverkeithing who served as surgeon of HMS Terror on Franklin's lost expedition.

== Career ==
John obtained his licence of the Royal College of Surgeons of Edinburgh as assistant surgeon in 1836.

Peddie entered service for the Royal Navy aboard HMS Sparrow on the 20th December 1836.

== Franklin expedition ==
John Smart Peddie served aboard the ill-fated HMS Terror on Franklin's expedition to find the Northwest passage. He had been promoted to the rank of Surgeon a few months after the expedition sailed. Peddie perished with the rest of the crew.

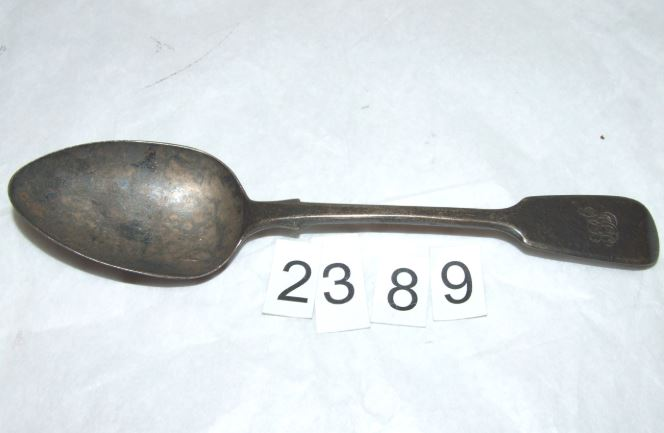
John Smart Peddie spoon, marked with initials JSP.

A fiddle-pattern silver dessert spoon owned by Peddie was found in the possession of an Inuit at Repulse Bay in 1854 by the Rae Expedition. The Inuit said that they had found the material at a camp to the north west of the mouth of the Back River where a party of Europeans had died of starvation.

Following searches for the crew of HMS Terror, in 1852 Eliza Peddie wrote to Eleanor Franklin:

"I quite agree with you that none of the officers are now living...They must have undergone such as we cannot contemplate without a shudder… I think like you that there is little chance of further intelligence of the missing ships...I intend to put on mourning."

== Grave ==
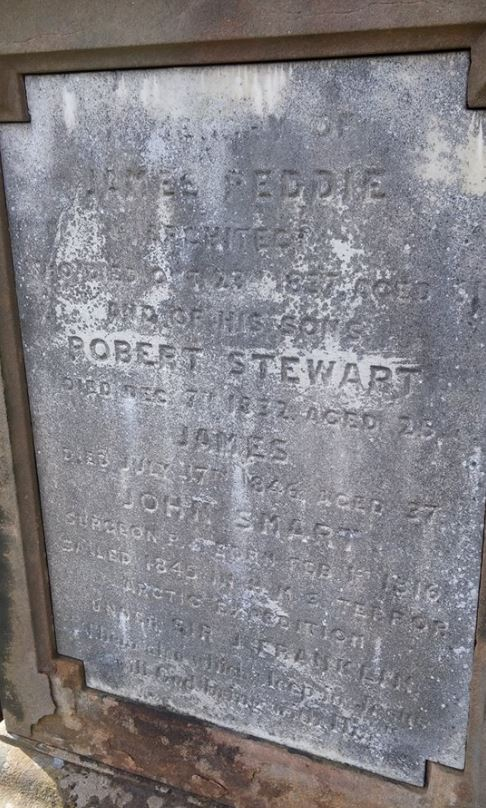
John Smart Peddie gravestone, Inverkeithing Parish Church.

Peddie is honoured on a gravestone in Inverkeithing Parish Church graveyard, his home town, along with his father and brothers.

Peddie and his daughter have a small memorial plaque in St Luke's Church in Charlton, south east London. The plaque reads:

In memory of Annie Eliza PEDDIE, daughter of John Peddie, Esq., Surgeon, R.N. and Eliza Matilda, his wife, died 12 February 1849, aged 4½ years.

"Suffer little children to come unto Me, and forbid them not, for us such is the Kingdom of God".

Also in memory of John Stuart Peddie, Esq., father of the above, Surgeon H.M.S. Terror, who perished in the Polar Regions in the Expedition under Capt. John FRANKLIN.
