= James Scott (captain) =

Royal Navy captain (1767–1850)

- Captain James Scott (1767–1850), oil portrait, located in Inverkeithing Civic Centre.

Superintenant of the Queensferry Passage
- In office 1810–1839

Military service
- Battles/wars: Battle of Copenhagen

James Scott (1767–1850) was a captain who served in the Royal Navy and later served as the first Superintendent of the Queensferry Passage between 1810 and 1839.

He was instrumental in modernising the route, improving safety, and introducing the first steamer service over the Firth of Forth, the Queen Margaret, in 1821.

His near 30 year tenure oversaw the growth in importance and prosperity of North Queensferry, and Scott is buried in Inverkeithing Parish Church under the epitaph "Master of the Queensferry Passage".

== Early life and naval career ==
Scott was born in Inverkeithing, Fife, in 1767.

He began his career as a clerk in Fordell Colliery. Scott was married to Margaret Cockburn on 1 November 1795.

Scott joined the Royal Navy, and served in several celebrated battles. He served under Admiral Duncan and was present at the Mutniy of the Nore and the Battle of Camperdown, aboard HMS Belliqueux (1780). He served at the Battle of Copenhagen (1801) under Admiral Horatio Nelson.

He left the Navy in 1801. At some point he was a press gang leader.

== 'Superintendent of the Queensferry Passage' ==
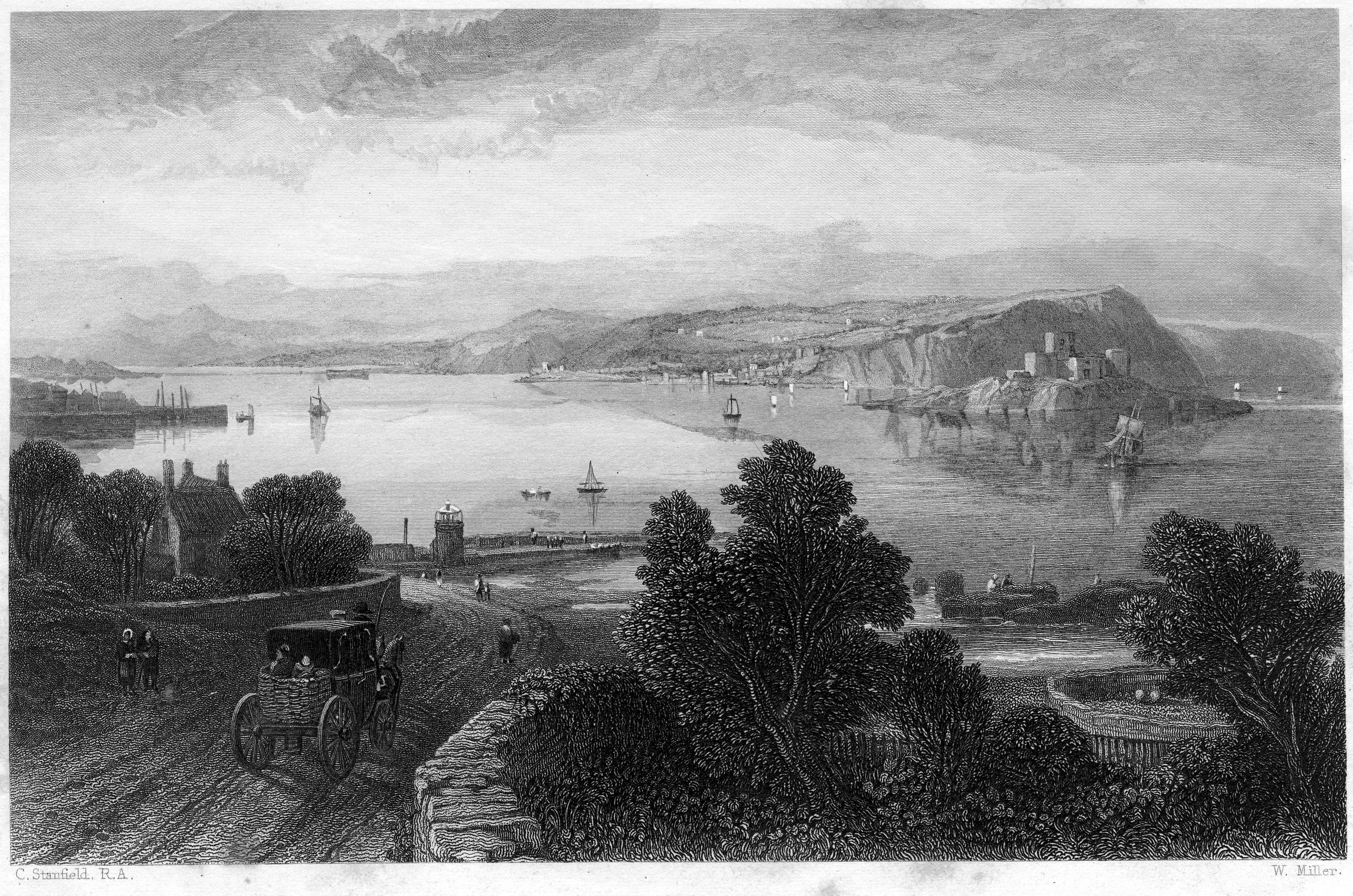
The Queensferry Passage from the South East, engraving by William Miller, c. 1842.

The New Statistical Account of Queensferry tells us that in 1809, the Queensferry Passage - the historic crossing between North Queensferry and South Queensferry - was dangerous:

“There were no suitable piers, no superintendents, boats only at the North Ferry, where all the boatmen lived, other traffic at the wharfs unconnected with the passage, and the arrangements at the piers so incomplete, as to admit of passage only four and a half hours in each tide. The rates and dues belonged to individuals, and the jurisdiction was such, that the proprietors could not be compelled to keep the piers in a state of repair.”

As a result, in an Act of Parliament in 1810 established the Forth Ferries Trust, with the authority to construct piers, access roads, boatmen's houses and other infrastructure.

In 1810, Scott was appointed the first 'Superintendent of the Queensferry Passage' by the trust. The Trust had appointed him on the basis he was "perfectly accustomed to the habits of command and skilled in the navigation and management of the vessels".

In 1810, the Forth Ferry Trustees purchased Seabank House, North Queensferry, for £260-9s-1d as the private residence for Scott to live in; the house was chosen because it afforded a complete view of the passage. The move was not popular locally, and Scott was warned that Seabank was haunted, to which he replied to the effect that he had a loaded gun ready for the ghost whenever it liked to come.

In 1817, Scott called on Robert Stephenson to advise on how to furnish the passage with lighting. He wrote a memorandum pointing out that "in gales or aqually weather the gusts are sudden owing to this strait being nearly surrounded by high land. In the day time even when every eye is on watch... accidents can only be prevented by seeing such a gust take the water and preparing to receive it", and doubted the safety of navigating the passage "under the cloud of night".

James Scott in older age, with the Naval General Service Medal, c. 1849.

In his 1819 memorial to the Forth Trustees, Scott admitted his boats did not always run on time, after which he sought improvements to the crossing's piers and boats.

Scott was instrumental in introducing a steamer service and drew up specifications for the first steamboat for the crossing, the paddle steamer the Queen Margaret, launched on 1 October 1821. He chose a "middle class steamboat", and built a to scale model of the proposed ship.

Scott's salary in 1828 is listed at £120-00-00 annually.

During Scott's tenure, another paddle steamer - the William Adam - was launched in 1838, and for this he was presented a silver service. The Queen Margaret would be retired in 1841 and the William Adam in 1866.

In 1839, he retired from the role, at the age of 72, and was succeeded by a Mr Mason. He refused a £50 annual pension by the Forth Trustees on the grounds of its cost to the ferry passage.

== Personal life ==
Family plaque on James Scott's grave, Inverkeithing.

Scott is described in the 1830's as "pretty well advanced and hardly straight in figure" yet "active in his habits, springy in his movement and buoyant in his manners". He is said to have broken one or both of his legs.

His dress is described as "in the pink of almost youthful fashion with a broad brimmed beaver hat that inclined a little towards his shoulders and from it hung a queue or pigtail".

In 1842, Queen Victoria and Prince Albert visited North Queensferry. The Queen met Scott. It is reported she asked him to point out one of the islands, to which he replied "It's straucht fornent your Majesty".

== Death ==
James Scott's grave at Inverkeithing Parish Church kirkyard.

James Scott died on 26 March 1850, aged 83, and was buried in Inverkeithing Parish Church kirkyard. His memorial stone reads:

Battle has been seen and sailed in various climes

Thousands of beings saw in latter times

Ferried in safety back and fore to Fife

With Christian hope he crossed the sea of life
