= Inverkeithing Parish Church =

Church in Fife, Scotland

- Forthview Parish Church - Inverkeithing
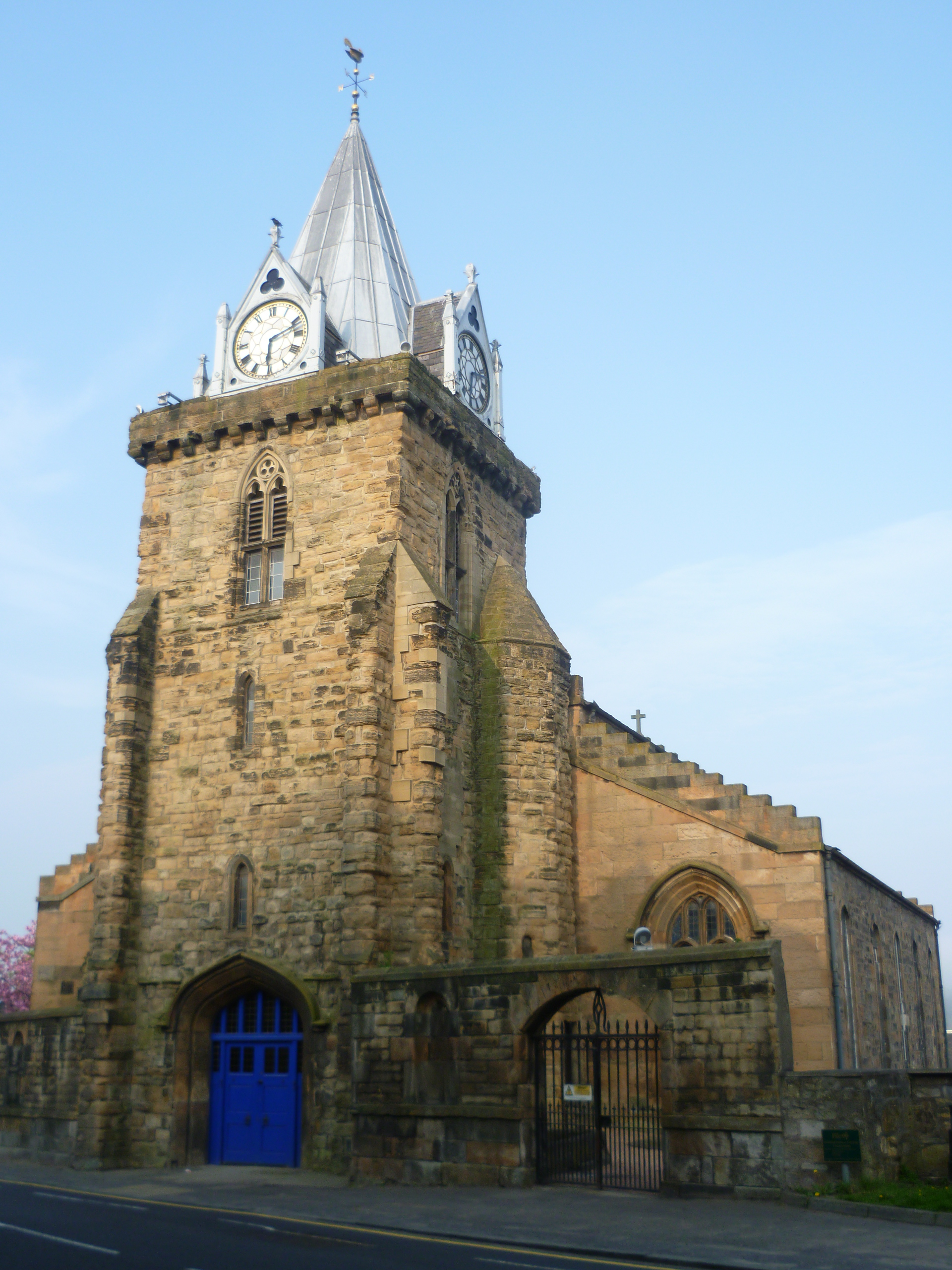
- The West front of Inverkeithing Parish Church.

- Location in Fife
- 56°01′54″N 3°23′49″W,
- Location: Church Street, Inverkeithing, Fife
- Country: Scotland
- Denomination: Church of Scotland
- Website: https://forthviewchurch.org.uk/inverkeithing/

History
- Status: Parish Church

Architecture
- Functional status: Active
- Heritage designation: Category B listed building
- Designated: 11th December 1972
- Style: Gothic
- Years built: 14th Century, mostly rebuilt 1827

Listed Building – Category B
- Official name: Church Street, Inverkeithing Parish Church (st Peter's Building; Church Of Scotland) Including Churchyard And Boundary Walls
- Designated: 11 December 1972
- Reference no.: LB35086

Inverkeithing Parish Church of St Peters is a Church of Scotland parish church in Inverkeithing in Fife, Scotland.

Dating from before 1139, the church has been at the centre of historic events such as the Scottish Catholic-Culdee dispute of 1250; the Inverkeithing witch hunt of 1621 to 1655; and the Inverkeithing Case of 1752, which led to the Second Secession of the Church of Scotland.

Notable ministers include Walter Bruce and Robert Roche, moderators of the General Assembly of the Church of Scotland. The church is closely connected with Queen Anabella Drummond of Scotland, who's gifted baptismal font of 1398 remains among the finest medieval furnishings to survive in any Scottish parish church.

The church kirkyard has memorials dating between 1606 and 1864, and contains notable graves to John Smart Peddie, James Scott, William Gurley and Ebenezer Brown.

The church retains its 14th century tower, with much of the rest of the building rebuilt after the fire of 1825, and is category B listed by Historic Scotland.

== History ==
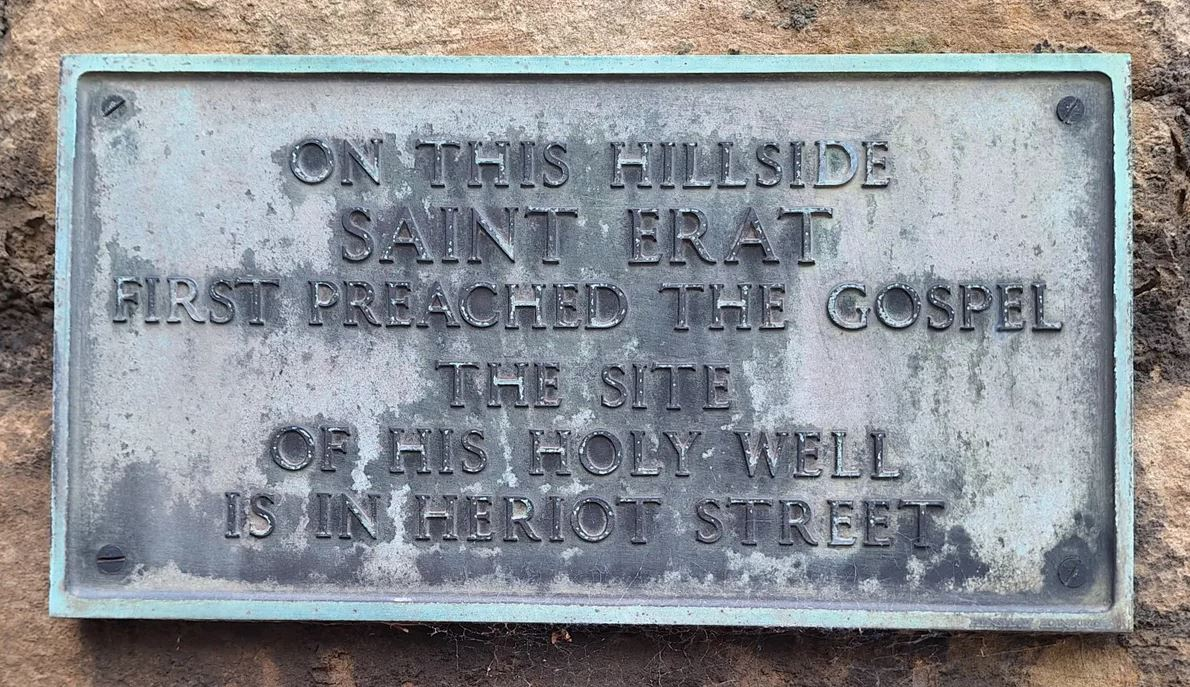
Dedication to St Erat outside Inverkeithing Parish Church.

=== Legend ===
Legend suggests St Erat, a follower of St Ninan, founded the first church here around the fifth century.

=== Medieval era ===
Reliable sources indicate the church was founded by Waltheof of Allerdale as a wooden Celtic church. Waltheof had inherited the lands of Inverkeithing from his father, Gospatric. The original wooden church was adapted into a Norman stone structure, which Waltheof bequeathed to the monks of Dunfermline Abbey in 1139.

In 1163, Inverkeithing Parish clergy were summoned to Pope Alexander III's Council of Tours of the British Isles.

The stone church was completed in 1244, and it was consecrated to St. Peter by Bishop David de Bernham on 24 August 1244.

The 14th century Lanercost Chronicle records that in 1282 the parish priest of Inverkeithing was accused of participating in pagan-inspired festivities and was subsequently killed by a local parishioner. The episode was cited by Margaret Murray in The God of the Witches (1931) to support her hypothesis of the survival of British paganism into the Middle Ages.

The Norman foundations were reused for the 13th century Gothic structure, and a tower was added in the 14th century. In pre-Reformation times the church had altars to St. Michael, the Holy Blood, John the Baptist, St. Catherine, the Holy Rood, St. Laurence, St. Ninian and St. Mary.

Inverkeithing Parish Church depicted in the first detailed map of Scotland by Timothy Pont, c. 1583-1613.

A choir had been in existence at the church in 1330; the vicar applied to Dunfermline Abbey for the funds to decorate and repair it.

==== The Scottish Catholic-Culdee dispute of 1250 ====
A great meeting of the Romish and Culdee clergy was held in Inverkeithing parish church in 1250 for the discussion of ecclesiastical questions. According to Cunningham (1899), the Roman Catholic clergy "acted haughtily, and overpowered and silenced the Culdees". This is said to be the last public meeting attended by the Culdees, who soon became an extinct body. The meeting at Inverkeithing cemented and furthered the supremacy of the Roman Catholic church in Scotland.

=== 16th - 19th centuries ===
==== The Reformation ====
During the Scottish Reformation riots of 1560, two friary convents in Inverkeithing were destroyed. From 1570 onwards, Inverkeithing parish church had a Presbyterian minister.

The Synod of Fife under James Melville met at Inverkeithing Parish Church on September 2, 1605, in response to the imprisonment in Blackness Castle of six ministers for taking part in the forbidden General Assembly of Aberdeen; they had been dramatically forbidden entrance to Dunfermline by the Provost loyal to James VI.

In 1611, Inverkeithing Parish Church absorbed the adjacent parish of Rosyth. By 1634, the church of Rosyth became ruinous, and so the union was formally decreed in 1636.

===== Witch Hunting =====
Church records of the 17th century show examples of superstitious behaviour were denounced, which included: "carrying the dead body about the Kirk before burial", "kindling of bonfires upon superstitious nights vis Midsomer - Alhallowes", and "resorting to wells denominat of saints in a superstitious way for obtaining health to sick and distracted persons". "Those that observe Yule Day" are mentioned as superstitious persons who should mend their ways.

The Inverkeithing witch hunt took place between 1621 and 1655 saw the executions of at least 51 people. Many of these executions were under the leadership of Walter Bruce, who was presented to the parish personally by King Charles I in 1641.

===== The Glorious Revolution =====
In 1689, minister Alexander Irvine was deprived of his ministership for lack of support for William III and Queen Mary following the Glorious Revolution.

On May 5, 1689, there is a minute in the Kirk Session: "this day a thanksgiving was intimate to be observed on Thursday next to be given to ye lLord for delivering us from popery and arbitrary power". In 1689, the town provided 50 men and arms "in defence of the Protestant religion".

==== The Inverkeithing Case ====
The church became the focal point of the Inverkeithing Case of 1752, a significant dispute within the Church of Scotland surrounding the right of patronage. The dispute ended with the General Assembly of the Church of Scotland ordering the installation of Andrew Richardson as minister against the wishes of the congregation, and the deposition of Thomas Gillespie who was unwilling to follow orders. As a result, 127 members of the congregation left and formed St John's Church. The Inverkeithing case led directly to the Second Secession of the Church of Scotland with the founding of the Relief Church by Gillespie in 1761.

==== The fire of 1825 ====
Extensive fire damage in 1825 was caused by a spark from a brazier left unattended while plumbers working on the lead roof had lunch. The church was rebuilt by 1827 at a cost of £1400.

=== 20th century onwards ===
Inverkeithing Parish Church roll of honour for WWI.

During the First World War, 218 members of Inverkeithing Parish Church congregation served and survived, and 47 died in service. They are commemorated in a Roll of Honour inside the church (WMR reference number 79913).

On 3 August 2000, the BBC and other news outlets reported that the marriage of Gordon Brown and Sarah Macaulay would take place in Inverkeithing Parish Church. News crews staged outside the church, however the couple instead married at their nearby home in North Queensferry, and were wed by the minister of Inverkeithing Parish Church.

In 2024, Inverkeithing Parish Church of St Peters united with Aberdour St Fillan's, Dalgety Parish Church, North Queensferry Parish Church and Rosyth Parish Church to form Fife: Forthview Parish Church of Scotland.

== Architecture ==
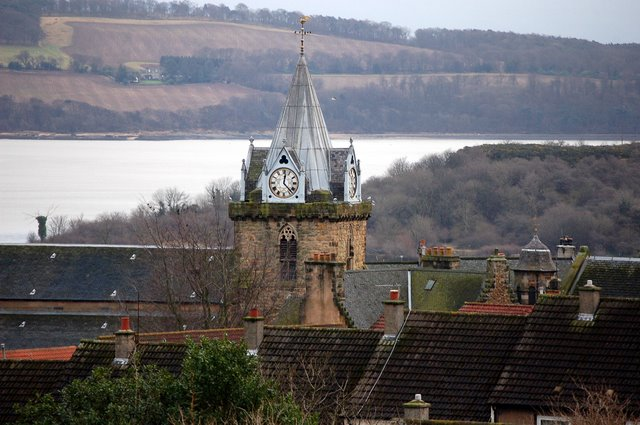
Church tower of Inverkeithing Parish church, completed in 1883.

This reduced the church to the height of its lower window sills, although the 14th century tower survived, but it was rebuilt. The main part of the church is thus a large plain neo-Gothic 'preaching box' of 1826–27, designed by James Gillespie Graham.

The tower is crowned by a lead-covered spire from 1835 designed by Thomas Bonnar, whose elaborate gabled dormers saw clock faces being added in 1883.

Most of the interior visible today was designed by Peter MacGregor Chalmers and dates from 1900.

== Stained Glass ==
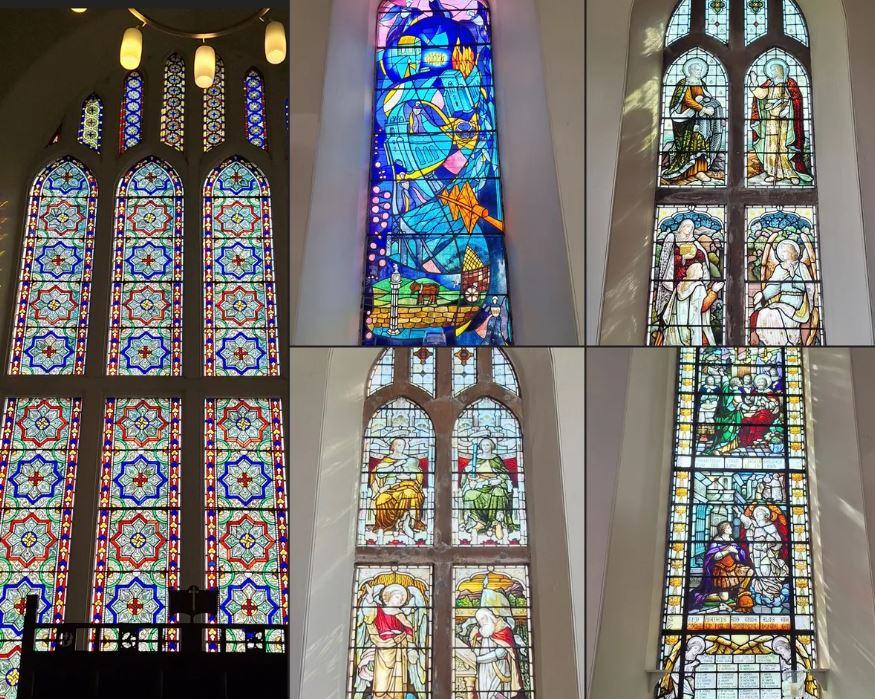
The stained glass windows of Inverkeithing Parish Church.

The largest stained glass window in the east wall is Munich glass, installed in 1856.

To either side of this window are two memorial windows. On the left is "The Resurrection", installed in 1900. On the right is "The Helmet of Salvation".

In the North wall is a window commemorating the 750th anniversary of the church and the ministry of Rev. John Johnston, minister from 1938 to 1981. The window was installed in 1998.

In the south wall is the War Memorial window, unveiled in 1921. Originally dedicated to those lost in the First World War, in 1949 a plaque was added to those who fell during the Second World War.

== Font ==
The church is graced by one of the finest medieval furnishings to survive in any Scottish parish church. This is the large and well-preserved sandstone font of around 1398, which was rediscovered in 1807 buried under the church along with the presumed relics of a saint, having been concealed at the Reformation. Its octagonal bowl is decorated with angels holding heraldic shields. These include the royal arms of the King of Scots, and of Queen Anabella Drummond, the consort of King Robert III. The high quality of the carving is explained by it being a royal gift to the parish church, Inverkeithing being a favourite residence of Queen Anabella (1350 - 1401).

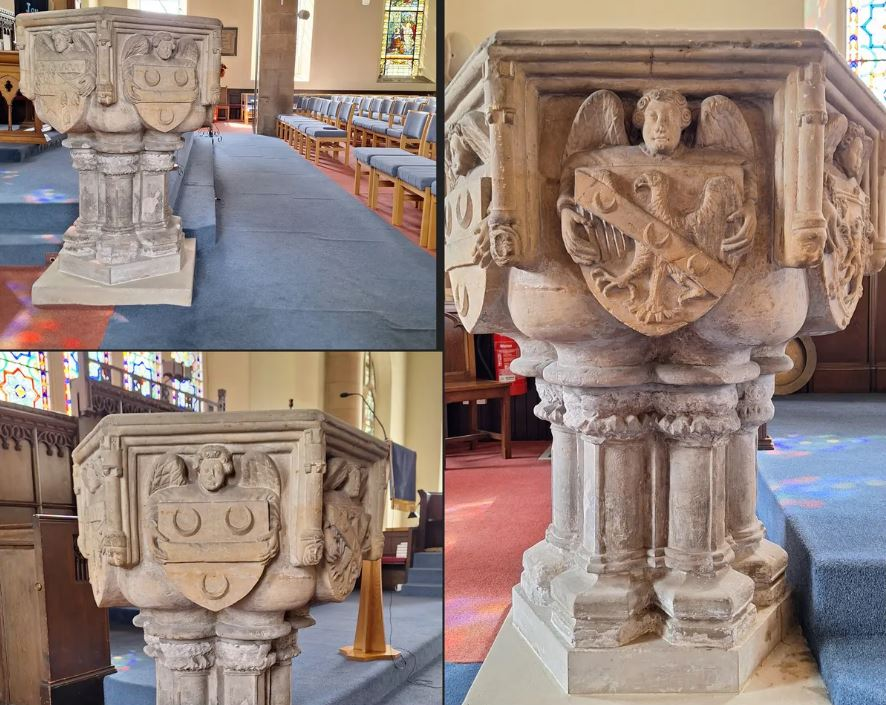
The Sandstone font given to Inverkeithing Parish Church by Anabella Drummond in 1398.

== Kirkyard ==
The church kirkyard contains the oldest gravestone in west Fife, to John Halliday, dated September 19 1604. Most gravestones are otherwise from the 18th and 19th centuries.

By 1850, the kirkyard was reaching capacity and so a new cemetery, Hope Street Cemetery, was established and opened in 1862; and the kirkyard was closed to the general public for burials in July 1864.

Andrew Cunningham (1899) wrote of Inverkeithing Parish Kirkyard:

"... if time is the universal beautifier, it is also the universal destroyer. Here there are stones whose inscriptions have been as completely wiped out by the bitter blasts of centuries as if the mason's chisel had been employed in the work of defacing; there inscriptions, like the memories of those whose remains lie under the tablets, are fading away, and it is difficult to make much of the quaint seventeenth and eighteenth century tributes."

Notable graves include:

- Dr John Smart Peddie (1816-1848), chief surgeon on HMS Terror.
- Captain James Scott (1767-1850), 'Master of Queensferry Passage'.
- Ebenezer Brown, minister (1780-1835), minister and son of John Brown of Haddington.
- Captain William Gurley (1783-1824), killed near Inverkeithing in one of the last duels in Scotland. His marble tombstone is broken, and retained in the church.
South entrance gates to Inverkeithing Parish Church kirkyard, built in 1827.

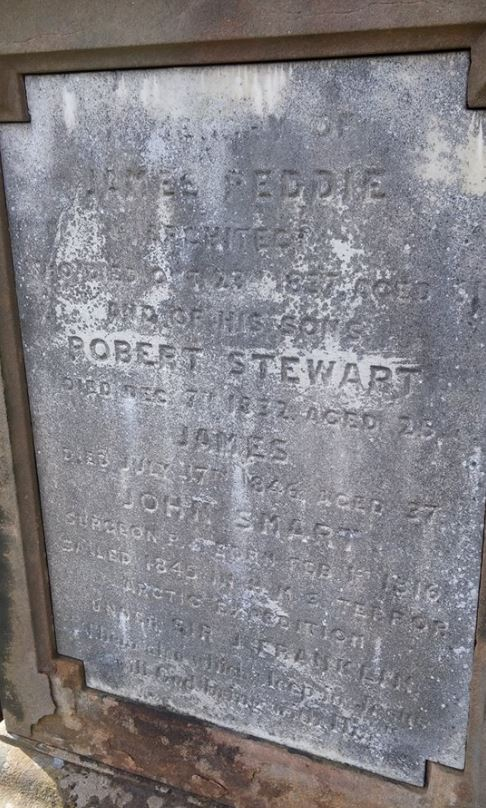
John Smart Peddie gravestone, chief surgeon on HMS Terror..

Early gravestone featuring a sand timer and skull and crossbones.

Gravestone of James Menzies, who died age 10 on 8 February 1827, and parents Eupheme and John.

Inverkeithing Parish church kirkyard, south section.

Inverkeithing Kirkyard gates, made in 1832.

== List of Ministers ==
The earliest record of a priest is simply recorded as "John", and he is recorded in the Lanercost Chronicle that in 1282 he participated in pagan-inspired festivities and was subsequently killed by a local parishioner.

In 1471, Richard Bellie is described as vicar of Inverkeithing, and in 1472 Nicholas Bully held the perpetual vicarage.

John Angus was a Roman Catholic minister of Inverkeithing before 1562; after he was appointed Archbishop of St. Andrews.

The earliest recorded Presbyterian minister is John Hutchinson in 1569, who was succeeded in August that year by Peter Blackwood.

The ministers from 1569 to present day are:

- 1569: John Hutchinson
- 1569 - 1570: Peter Blackwood
- 1570 - 1611: John Burne
- 1611 - 1640: Robert Roche
- 1641 - 1673: Walter Bruce
- 1673 - 1676: Robert Scott
- 1676 - 1681: David Lauder
- 1682 - 1689: Alexander Irvine (deprived of his charge for lack of support for William III and Queen Mary).
- 1689 - 1691: Robert Hodge
- 1692 - 1733: Samuel Charters, grandfather of Samuel Grieg.
- 1733 - 1744: Thomas Charters
- 1744 - 1749: Alan Buchanan
- 1752 - 1790: Andrew Richardson
- 1792 - 1845: Andrew Robertson
- 1845 - 1853: Peter McMorland
- 1853 - 1865: James MacKay
- 1866 - 1873: Alex Macgregor
- 1873 - 1895: John Glendinning Robertson
- 1896 - 1897: Donald Ferguson
- 1897 - 1938: William Stephen
- 1938 - 1981: John Johnston
- 1982 - 1988: Alan Birss
- 1988 - 2006: George G Nicol
- 2006 - 2010: Chris Park
- 2012 - 2023: Colin Alston
- 2025 - present: Elane Sassenberg
