= Hope Street Cemetery =

Cemetery in Inverkeithing, Scotland

- South section of Hope Street Cemetery, 2026.
- Interactive map of Hope Street Cemetery

Details
- Location: Hope Street Street; Inverkeithing
- Country: Scotland
- Coordinates: 56.0252715°N 3.4051030°W
- Owned by: Fife Council
- Find a Grave: Hope Street Cemetery

Hope Street Cemetery (also known as Inverkeithing Cemetery) is a cemetery in Inverkeithing in Fife, Scotland.

The cemetery, opened in 1862, has notable burials, including graves to Jane Seaton, Alexander Stoddart Wilson and twelve casualties of WWI and WWII.

== Location ==
Hope Street Cemetery is in the south of Inverkeithing, overlooking Inverkeithing Bay. The railway line running to and from the Forth Bridge, around 1.4 miles (2.3 km) to the southeast, abuts the cemetery to the east.

The cemetery is situated on a hill, formerly known as Witchknowe hill, with older graves towards the top (north) end.

Hope Street Cemetery, east gates.

Hope Street Cemetery, west gates.

Gothic memorial to Alexander Bruton and Janet MacQueen, 1887.

View from the top of Hope Street cemetery towards the Firth of Forth.

== History ==
During the Great Scottish witch hunt of 1649–50, executions were carried out at the site of Hope Street Cemetery on land known as Witch Knowe. Today this land is within Hope Street Cemetery and Witchknowe park.

By 1850, Inverkeithing Parish Church kirkyard was reaching capacity, so Hope Street cemetery was established and opened in 1862. The plans for the ground were drawn by W. Pringle, and cost £600.

In 1864, Jane Seaton, age 23, was buried at Hope Street Cemetery. The victim of "the Ratho Murder", her murderer George Bryce was the last man to be publicly executed in Edinburgh, on 21 June 1864. Her memorial stone reads:

JANE SEATON, aged 23 years.

I know O Lord that Thy judgements are right.

Into thine hand I commit my spirit, Thou hast redeemed me O Lord God of Truth, Psalm XXXI, 5.

Erected by the children to whom she was nurse as a mark of their love.

The Commonwealth Graves Commission lists 12 dead of World War I and World War II buried in the cemetery. Inverkeithing War Memorial in the town centre commemorates these and all the 166 men of Inverkeithing who died during both wars.

== Notable burials ==
- Richard Gunning Jeffreys (1799-1873), Royal Navy Commander famously gifted a gold chain by Napoleon Bonaparte while Midshipman on board HMS Undaunted in 1814. When landing from that Ship at Elba, Napoleon is said to have placed it over Jeffrey's neck and said "sois un brave Garçon".
- Douglas Donald Cameron Menzies L.R.C.P.S.E. (1841-1899), 19th-century medical practitioner.
- Jane Seaton (1841-1864), victim of "the Ratho Murder".
- Rev. Alexander Stoddart Wilson (1854–1909), naturalist, botanist and founder of the Andersonian Naturalists Society.
Grave of William Newton (1917-1942), Jewish Royal Navy seaman aboard HMS Drake.

Grave of John West (1850-1893), engineer accidently killed at the Broxburn Oil Company.

Grave of George Chaplin (1886-1916), WWI casualty aboard HMS Defence during the Battle of Jutland in May 1916.

Grave of Richard Gunning Jeffreys (1799-1873), Royal Navy commander gifted a gold chain by Napoleon.

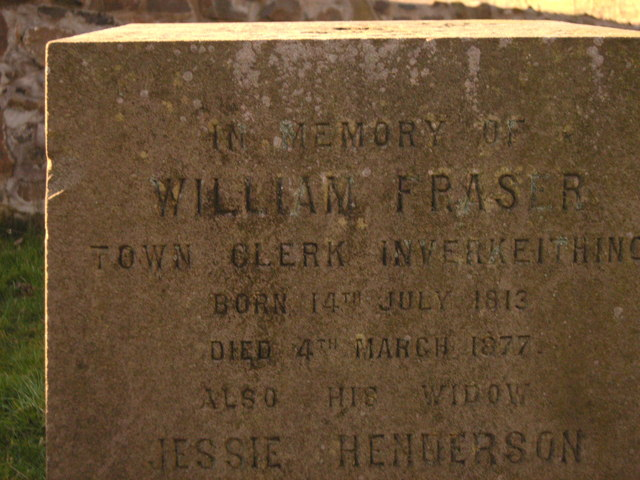
Grave of William Fraser (1813–1877), industrialist, financier and Town Clerk of Inverkeithing.
