= St Peter in Chains, Inverkeithing =

Coordinates: 56.0289°N 3.3999°W

The Church of St Peter in Chains
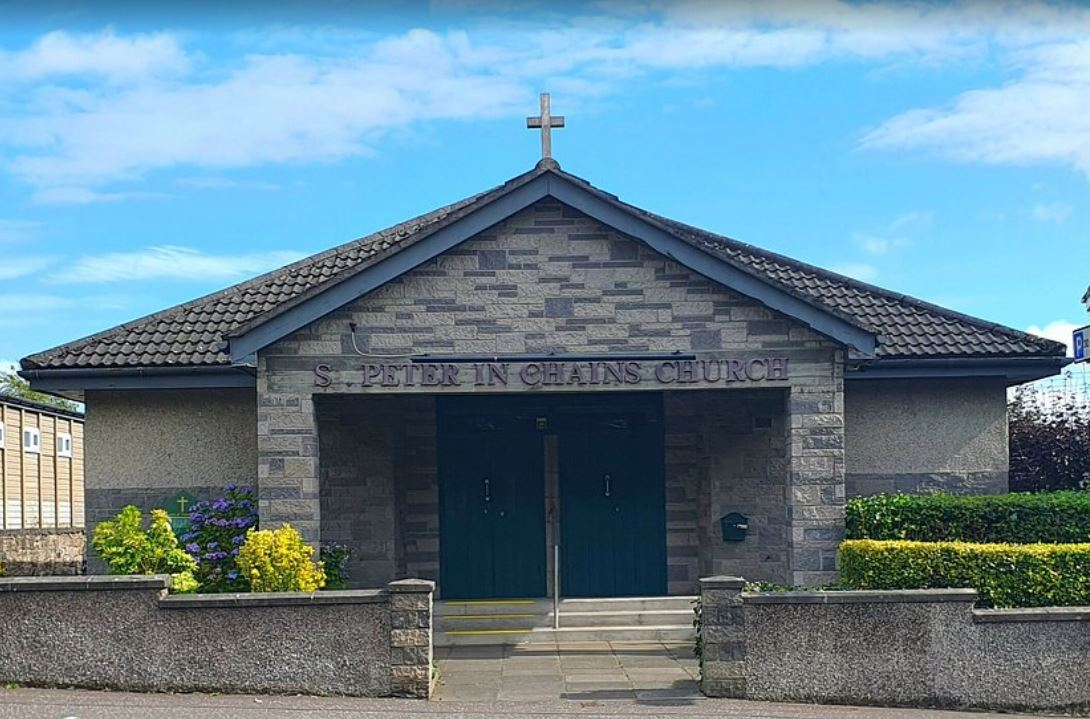
- Church of St Peter in Chains, front aspect (2024).
- The Church of St Peter in Chains
- Location: Hope Street, Inverkeithing
- Country: Scotland
- Denomination: Catholic
- Website: www.catholicswfife.com

Architecture
- Years built: 1976 - 1977

The Church of St Peter in Chains is a catholic parish church in the town of Inverkeithing in Fife, Scotland. Built in 1977, it serves the west Fife Catholic Parish of the Most Holy Trinity.

== History ==
The Protestant reformation in the 16th century had pushed Inverkeithing's medieval church – Inverkeithing Parish Church – away from Catholicism to the Church of Scotland.

The first recorded priest after the Reformation to work in Inverkeithing was Anthony Sweeney, a priest of the Diocese of Dunkeld, who had been loaned to Inverkeithing in 1909 when he was appointed assistant in St Margaret's Dunfermline. Fr Sweeney took up residence in 1913 in Clarence House, and returned a Roman Catholic congregation to the Inverkeithing area with the foundation of the Church of St Peter in Chains in nearby Jamestown.

Celtic Cross brick pattern in the front gardens of St Peter in Chains, Inverkeithing.

The development of the Royal Naval Dockyard at Rosyth after World War II led to the expansion of the congregation. By 1976, the church chose to build a new church at Hope Street, Inverkeithing. The church was completed in 1977, to serve North Queensferry, Inverkeithing, Hillend and Dalgety Bay.

== List of resident parish priests ==
In 1979, the role of resident parish priest to St Peter in Chains parish was first appointed. The appointments were as follows:

- 1979–1988, John Agnew
- 1988–1991, George Rogers
- 1991–2010, John McAllister

From 2010, the parishes of Inverkeithing and Rosyth shared the same parish priest, resident in Rosyth:

- 2010–2015, Peter Kelly
- 2015–2018, Kevin A. Dow

On 28 October 2018, Kevin Dow was appointed parish priest to a new grouping of the parishes of Inverkeithing, Dunfermline and Rosyth.
