= Caledonia High School (Rosyth) =

Secondary school in Rosyth, Fife, Scotland

Caledonia High School (CHS)

Location
- Caledonia Heights; Rosyth, Fife, KY11 2WW; Scotland; 56.0354°N 3.4399°W

Information
- Type: Secondary school
- Established: 2026
- Local authority: Fife
- Head teacher: Graham Belford
- Years offered: S1–S6 (S6 Students in rare cases may be able to stay an extra year)
- Age range: 11–18
- Language: English
- Hours in school day: Monday, Tuesday, Wednesday & Thursday; 08:40–15:35; Friday; 08:40–12:25
- Campus size: 135,286.64 m^{2} (1,456,213.3 sq ft)

Caledonia High School is a new secondary school in the town of Rosyth on Fife's south western coast 3 miles south of the city centre of Dunfermline. Rosyth neighbours Dunfermline and Inverkeithing where it has replaced the old Inverkeithing High School.

Located just off the A985 in the western end of the town. Its north-west of the two Ministry of Defence Naval bases HMS Caledonia, and HMS Scotia as well as the nearby former Royal Naval Rosyth Dockyard. Part of the land of the school was bought from the Ministry of Defence.

The school will have the capacity for up to 1735 pupils according to Ever J minister for Rosyth and has over 3 floors.

== History ==
In November 2020, the education and children's services committee voted 14–4 in favour of building a new secondary school to replace Inverkeithing High School in the Fleet Grounds, in Rosyth. The school was to open to pupils by August 2026.

On 11 July 2024, construction started in Caledonia Heights, Rosyth to replace the 50 year old Inverkeithing High School in the neighbouring town of Inverkeithing.

In July 2026, BAM handed the keys over to Fife Council, with the school officially open to pupils on 19 August 2026.

=== Naming the School ===
Since the secondary school was not in Inverkeithing a new name had to be picked. A survey was launched to decide the name of the new secondary school which received just under 7000 votes.

The Survey Results were as follows:

Votes for the Name of the School
Name of School	Votes	Percentage
Caledonia	3212	47.49%
Forth	1113	16.45%
Janet McCallum	735	10.87%
Rosyth	1704	25.19%

Votes for the Title of the School
Title	Votes	Percentage
Academy	3106	45.81%
High School	3674	54.19%

The name Caledonia won with a large plurality and the title High School won with a small majority naming the new secondary school Caledonia High School.

== Catchment Area ==
The catchment area for the secondary school is identical to the catchment area of Inverkeithing High School.

The school teaches pupils from:

- Rosyth
- Dalgety Bay
- Inverkeithing
- North Queensferry
- Aberdour
- High Valleyfield
- Hillend

But also from regions of Dunfermline under exceptional circumstances.

The schools main feeder primary schools are:

- Aberdour Primary School, Aberdour
- Dalgety Bay Primary School, Dalgety Bay
- Donibristle Primary School, Dalgety Bay
- Inverkeithing Primary School, Inverkeithing
- North Queensferry Primary School, North Queensferry
- Camdean Primary School, Rosyth
- Kings Road Primary School, Rosyth
- Park Road Primary School, Rosyth
- St John's RC Primary School, Rosyth
- Torryburn Primary School, Torryburn (near High Valleyfield)

== Facilities ==
- Accessible indoor and outdoor spaces
- Large assembly hall which can hold up to 350 people
- Large digital capacity with modern technology
- Grass pitches (including all weather pitches)
- Multi-use games areas that will be available for community use.
- Community garden with a greenhouse
- Table Tennis court
- Basketball court

Caledonia High School unlike its predecessor Inverkeithing High School does not have a swimming pool according to Fife Council and Ash Robertson.

== Building Design ==
Caledonia High School will consume 75% less energy than standard UK new builds, following the Passivhaus principles. It will feature a lot of natural lighting and be much more eco-friendly compared to its predecessor Inverkeithing High School.

The school is designed to reduce carbon and running costs. This makes a large contribution to meeting net zero carbon goals in Fife.
