= Inverkeithing Lazaretto =

19th-century Scottish quarantine station

Inverkeithing lazaretto
- Sketch of Inverkeithing land lazaretto (1829)

General information
- Location: Cruickness, Inverkeithing, Fife, Scotland.
- Year built: 1810
- Closed: 1835

Design and construction
- Known for: Quarantine station

Inverkeithing Lazaretto was a land quarantine station that stood at Cruickness in Inverkeithing, in Fife, between 1810 and 1835. Inverkeithing and Dunoon Lazaretto were the only two land lazarettos in Scotland.

== History ==
In 1792, an organised quarantine station was established in Inverkeithing Bay. It was a large ship, moored first in the East Ness of Inverkeithing Harbour, then removed to the West Ness further from the town centre.

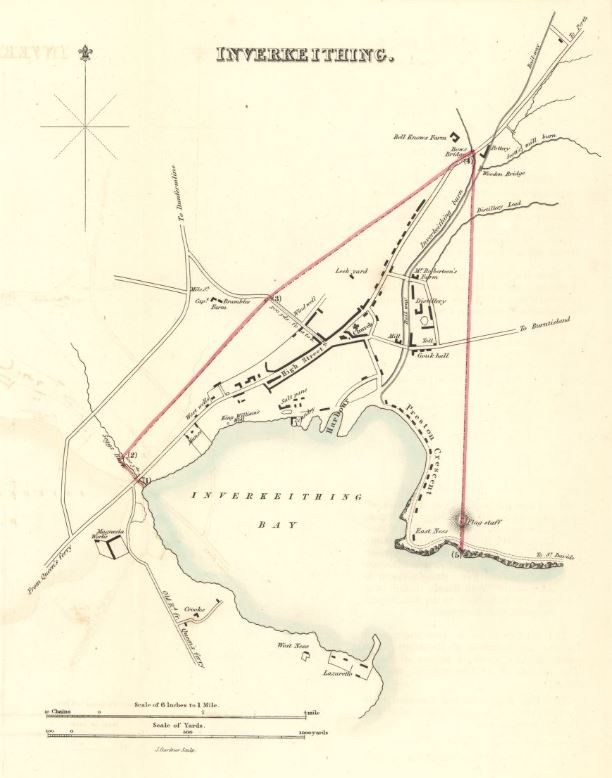
1832 map of Inverkeithing Parish, with Inverkeithing Lazaretto marked (middle bottom).

In 1810, HM Commissioners of Customs built a land lazaretto in Cruickness (Jamestown, Inverkeithing) on land acquired from a Dr. Forrest of Stirling. The station consisted of a three-story wooden structure and two stone houses, all enclosed by a wall with two doorways and an aperture to pass food to the men within.

In 1825, several old war vessels were placed nearby in St Margaret's hope for quarantine purposes, so the lazaretto fell out of use temporarily.

During the 1826 - 1837 cholera pandemic, Scotland had an outbreak of cholera in 1832 and the use of the lazaretto was revived. Inverkeithing had 28 cholera related deaths in 7 weeks in 1832 during the pandemic.

By 1835, the pandemic had disappeared and the site was no longer in use. The entire property was sold to William Mackersy of Edinburgh in 1835.

Today, the two stone houses survive, and are named Craignook and Ardalanish.

== In literature ==
James Simson, born 1826, was a Scottish author who grew up around the lazaretto where his father Walter Simson was in charge. In 1882, Simson also published "Reminisces of Childhood at Inverkeithing, or, Life at a Lazaretto" about his childhood at Inverkeithing Lazaretto.
