= Inverkeithing High School =

Secondary school in Inverkeithing, Fife, Scotland

Inverkeithing High School (IHS)
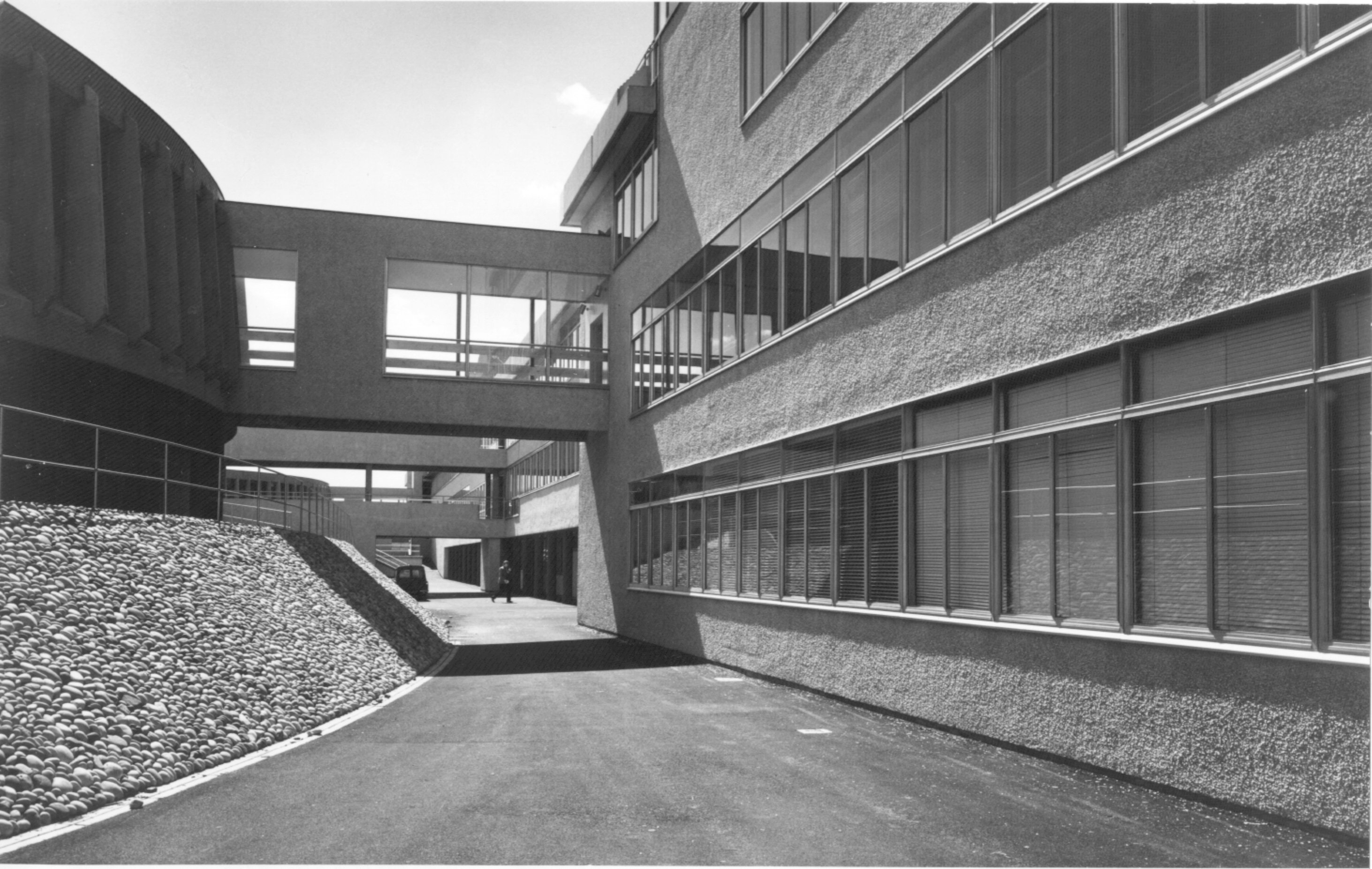

Location
- Hillend Road; Inverkeithing, Fife, KY11 1PL; Scotland; 56°02′08″N 03°23′10″W

Information
- Type: Secondary school
- Motto: We Grow by Choice
- Established: 1972
- Status: Abandoned
- Closed: 2026
- Local authority: Fife
- Years offered: S1–S6
- Language: English
- Hours in school day: Monday and Wednesday; 08:40–15:25; Tuesday, Thursday and Friday; 08:45–15:15
- Campus size: 115,000 m^{2} (1,240,000 sq ft)
- Houses: 2024–2026; Palace; Castle; Abbey; Tower; 2022–2024; Bramble; Fern; Thistle; 1972–2022; Palace; Castle; Abbey; Tower
- Colour: black / white

Inverkeithing High School is a now closed secondary school in Scotland. It is located in Inverkeithing, a historic town on Fife's southern coast 3½ miles from Dunfermline city centre, between the towns of Dalgety Bay and Rosyth.

The school had around 1,500 pupils (with students ranging in age from 11 to 18), with 94% of students coming from within the catchment area and 6% of students coming from outside the catchment area. The school employed approximately 150 staff.

The building has been a Category B Listed Building since 2004 according to Fife Council official Autumn.

Inverkeithing High School was replaced by Caledonia High School in the neighbouring town of Rosyth in 2026. Inverkeithing High School was open for 53 years from opening to closure.

== History ==
The school dates from the early 1970s and was designed by architect Gavin Haveron McConnell, who was influenced by Le Corbusier and introduced some elements into the structure such as the pilotis which give open circulation under part of the building, and the accessible roof space. In 2004, the building received Listed status (Category B) from Historic Environment Scotland for its inventive Late Modern design.

In 2007, Inverkeithing High School became the first secondary school in Fife to be awarded an Eco-Schools Green Flag – this reflects the staff and students commitment to the environment. In November 2011 the school successfully passed the assessment for a third Green Flag. The school also achieved the Radio Forth Teacher of the Year 2011, Mrs Gordon, as a staff member.

In November 2020, the education and children's services committee voted 14–4 in favour of building a new secondary school to replace Inverkeithing High School in Rosyth. It opened to teachers and pupils in 2026.

The school celebrated its 50th birthday in 2023 after pupils first went to Inverkeithing High School in 1973.

After a storm encompassing heavy rainfall in the early hours of Friday 26th June 2026, the high school saw its last time open to students very briefly before students were sent home. The storm had left structural and electrical damage leaving the school permanently closed a week early, meaning students did not get to have their final week at the high school before its permanent closure.

== Catchment area ==
The school mostly taught pupils from:

- Inverkeithing
- Hillend
- Dalgety Bay
- Rosyth
- North Queensferry
- Aberdour
- High Valleyfield

But also from regions of Dunfermline under exceptional circumstances.

The schools main feeder primary schools were:

- Aberdour Primary School, Aberdour
- Dalgety Bay Primary School, Dalgety Bay
- Donibristle Primary School, Dalgety Bay
- Inverkeithing Primary School, Inverkeithing
- North Queensferry Primary School, North Queensferry
- Camdean Primary School, Rosyth
- Kings Road Primary School, Rosyth
- Park Road Primary School, Rosyth
- St John's RC Primary School, Rosyth
- Torryburn Primary School, Torryburn (near High Valleyfield)

== Facilities ==
Facilities included an expansive bus park that serviced over 15 free school buses leading to parts of the catchment area, an outdoor Astroturf football pitch located next to the bus park, multiple football fields outside, as well as an indoor fitness room, swimming pool, basketball court and two sports halls within the Physical Education department.

There were also many free parking spaces and bike shelters on-site and an assembly hall, adjacent to two of the three dining halls, with a stage and mezzanine.

== Uniform ==
The school had a standard Scottish school uniform with the main colours of black and white being used. The school tie was stripy black and white for S1–S5s however S6s used a distinct senior tie which was black with the school logo on the top.

== Sports ==
The school had sports teams in sports such as football, rugby and basketball. In the 2012–2013 season, the school managed fourth place in the Fife school basketball league and reached the third round with every year group in the Scottish Cup. The PE department had an active role in participating in teacher vs pupil matches across all sports, with the help of other teachers if needed.

== Notable former pupils ==
- Stephen Hendry – World Snooker champion
- Michael Scott – Professional footballer
- Gordon Durie – Professional footballer
- Tim Jones CBE (RAF officer), Deputy Chief of the Defence Staff of the United Kingdom.
- Morgan Cross - Professional footballer

== Notable former staff ==
- Lindsay Roy – Glenrothes Labour MP (2008–2015)
