= St Bridget's Kirk =

Ruined church in Dalgety Bay, Fife, Scotland

Coordinates: 56.0398°N 3.3345°W

St. Bridget's Kirk
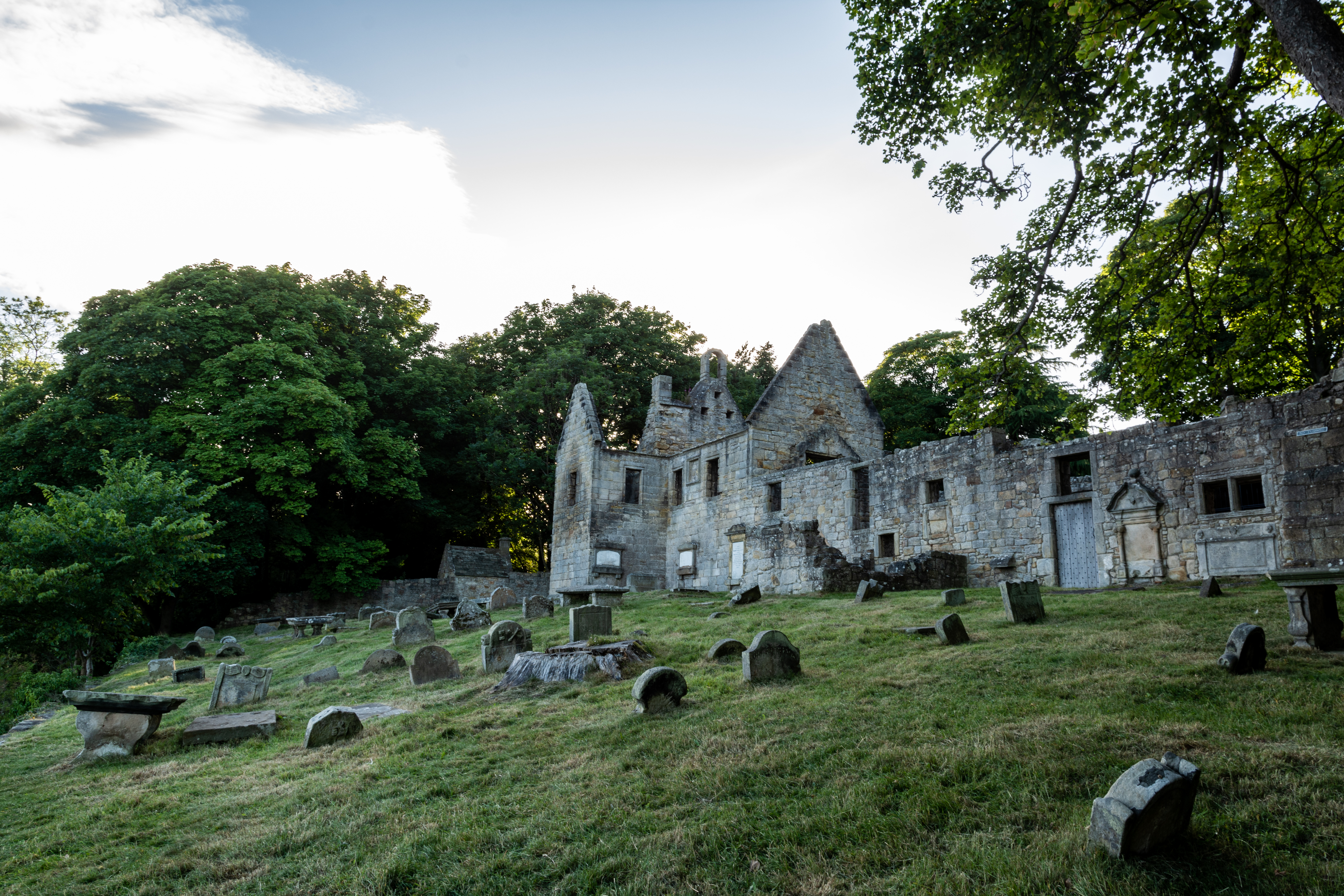
- Ruins of St. Bridget's Kirk
- Interactive map of the St. Bridget's Kirk area

General information
- Location: Dalgety Bay, Fife, Scotland

Scheduled monument
- Official name: St Bridget's Kirk
- Type: Ecclesiastical: burial avile/vault; burial ground, cemetery, graveyard; church
- Designated: 31 December 1936
- Reference no.: SM90266

St. Bridget's Kirk is a ruined church on the outskirts of Dalgety Bay, Fife, Scotland. It is a shell of a medieval church, dating back at least as far as 1178, and was altered in the 17th century for Protestant worship. It has been a ruin since the 19th century.

== History ==
The church was part of the old village of Dalgety, and the ruins are the only surviving feature of it. It was in existence by at least 11 March 1178 when Pope Alexander III issued a papal bull, calling for the founding of the "Church at Dalgetty with its appurtenances". The church was later appropriated by the nearby Inchcolm Abbey, and in 1244 it was consecrated by David de Bernham, Bishop of St. Andrews.

In 1641, the Rev. Andrew Donaldson became minister at St Bridget's, and oversaw the building of a school. He opposed the imposition of the Episcopalianism of Charles I, and was deposed from the parish for his Presbyterianism. He refused to leave and had to be forcibly removed from the church by soldiers despatched by Archbishop James Sharp. Donaldson was subsequently imprisoned, but due to the shifting political situation, was eventually allowed to return to the parish and resume his duties.

St Bridget's was substantially altered in the seventeenth century, but by the early nineteenth century, had become unsafe. The roof was lost in 1830, and a new church was built half a mile inland.

== The Church today ==
The ruins are maintained by Historic Environment Scotland. The loft can still be accessed, and the church's piscina survives in good condition. The church has three distinct aisles adjacent to the main room: the large Dunfermline Aisle to the west, built around 1610, contains a burial vault for the Earls of Dunfermline, and Alexander Seton, 1st Earl of Dunfermline is buried here. The Fordell Aisle to the north is a late 16th-century addition, and the small Inglis Aisle next to it dates from the early 17th century. An open-air service is held at the church every year in June. Several carved gravestones remain in the old churchyard, some from as early as 1665. A 'keep' is built into the churchyard wall, providing a place from which the church beadles could guard against body-snatchers.
