= Naval Base Mansions =

Former boarding house in Fife, Scotland

- Naval Base Mansions (2026).
- Interactive map of Naval Base Mansions
- Location: Jamestown, Fife.

History
- Built: C. 1909
- Built for: Rosyth Naval Dockyard

Site notes
- Architect: William Williamson

Listed Building – Category B
- Official name: JAMESTOWN, FERRYHILLS ROAD, NAVAL BASE MANSIONS
- Designated: 09/03/2004
- Reference no.: LB51009

Naval Base Mansions is a former boarding house in Jamestown in Fife, Scotland.

Built around 1909 to house labourers for the new Rosyth Naval Dockyard, the building is notable for its Hennebique technique construction and is category B listed by Historic Scotland.

== History ==
The building was designed in 1904 by William Williamson and built circa 1909 by contractors J. A. Mactaggart & Co. of Glasgow. The building was designed to house 600 labourers of Rosyth Naval Dockyard, which also began construction in 1909.

Naval Base Mansions is a Hennebique technique reinforced concrete construction, with 3,344 square meters of internal space. According to Historic Scotland, the most noteworthy original feature of the building was the "recreational hall which measured 39m long and 10m wide without intermediary supports of any kind".

A significant portion of the labourers residing at Naval Base Mansions were Irish Catholic.

On 20th March, 1919, Naval Base Mansions were purchased by the Admiralty.

In 1924, the building was still used by the Admiralty for storage, and later became private commercial property.

Naval Base Mansions, 1909.

Naval Base Mansions with Jamestown & Inverkeithing Bay.

Front signage at Naval Base Mansions (2026).

== Listed building designation ==
Naval Base Mansions was awarded category B listed status by Historic Scotland in March 2004.

According to their statement of special interest, the building is listed "for its historic interest and its use of Hennebique technique reinforced concrete construction", and "the early modern history of Jamestown... is closely associated with [Naval Base Mansions]."
