= Jamestown, Fife =

Hamlet in Fife, Scotland

Coordinates: 56°01′23″N 3°24′13″W

Jamestown: Scottish Gaelic: Baile Sheumais; Scots: Jamestoun
- Hamlet
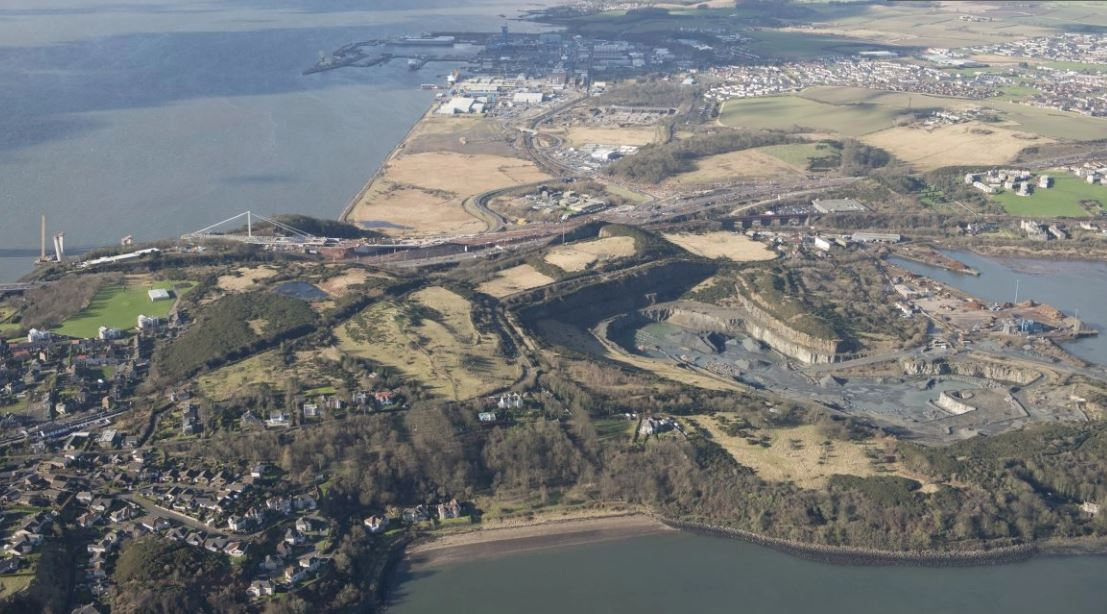
- Jamestown (right) from above, 2015.
  - Edinburgh: 9.4 mi (15.1 km)
- Country: Scotland
- Sovereign state: United Kingdom
- Post town: Inverkeithing
- Police: Scotland
- Fire: Scottish
- Ambulance: Scottish
- UK Parliament: Cowdenbeath and Kirkcaldy

Jamestown is a hamlet in Fife, Scotland. It is contiguous with North Queensferry and Inverkeithing, and is 9 miles (14 km) northwest of Edinburgh city centre.

Located on the south side of the Inner Bay of Inverkeithing Bay, an inlet of the Firth of Forth, Jamestown became an important centre for shipping and industry during the 19th century, and shipbreaking in the 20th century.

Jamestown is located on the Fife Coastal Path and the Fife Pilgrim Way, and is part of the Ferryhills Nature Protected Area. The nearby Jamestown Viaduct carries the Fife Circle Line over the hamlet, and the M90 motorway passes by to the west.

== Toponymy ==
Jamestown takes its name from James Reid, who converted the 19th century chemical works situated here into dwellings.

== Geography ==
The settlement of Jamestown is located at the northern base of the Ferry Hills. Jamestown is located on Inverkeithing Bay, an inlet of the Firth of Forth.

Jamestown is contiguous with North Queensferry and Inverkeithing. The nearest cities are Dunfermline, 4 miles northwest, and Edinburgh, 9 miles southeast.

Jamestown lies on the Fife Pilgrim Way and the Fife Coastal Path, one of Scotland's great trails. Jamestown is partly within the Ferryhills Nature Protected area.

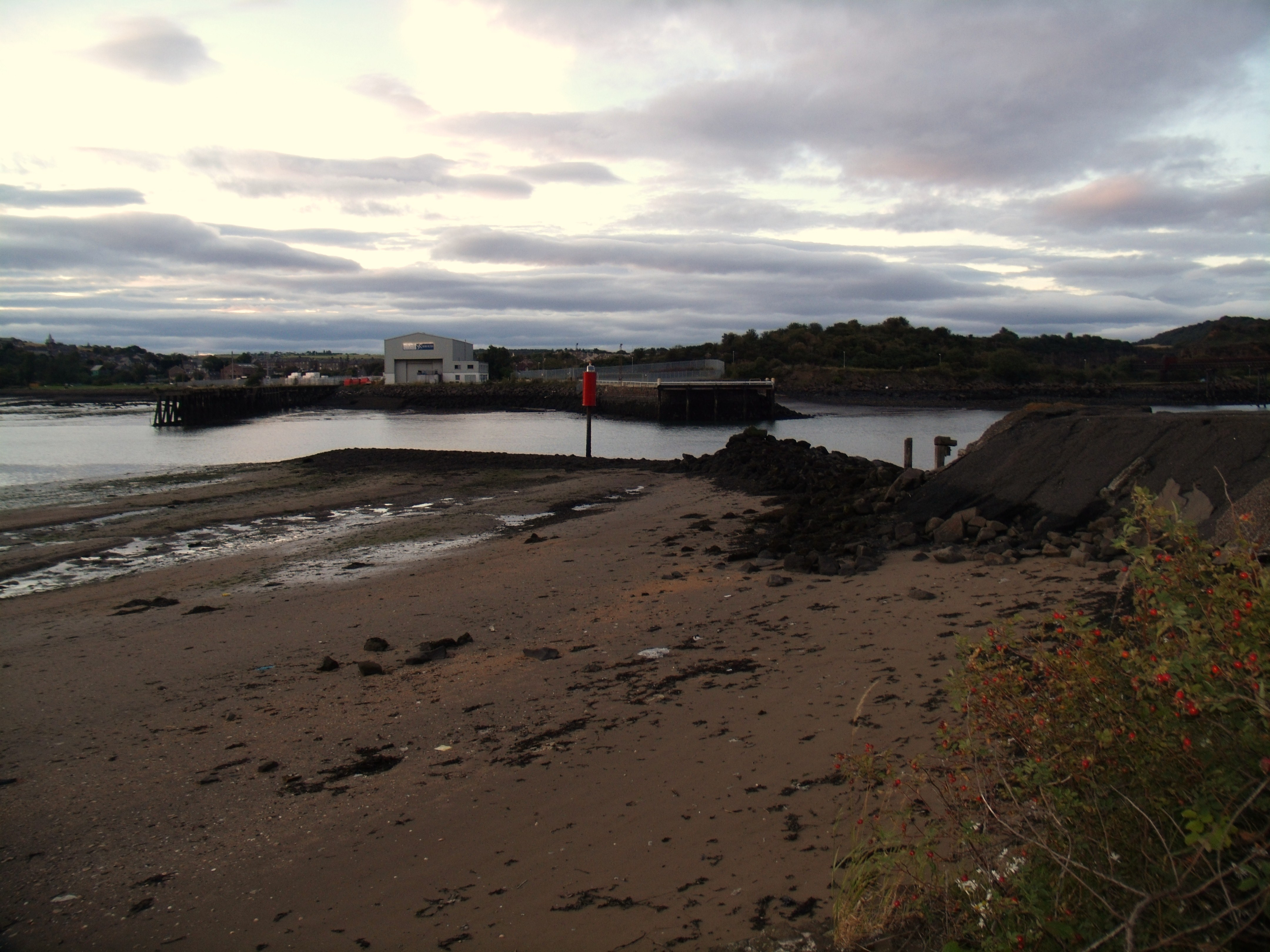
Small beach in Jamestown, on the Fife Coastal Path.

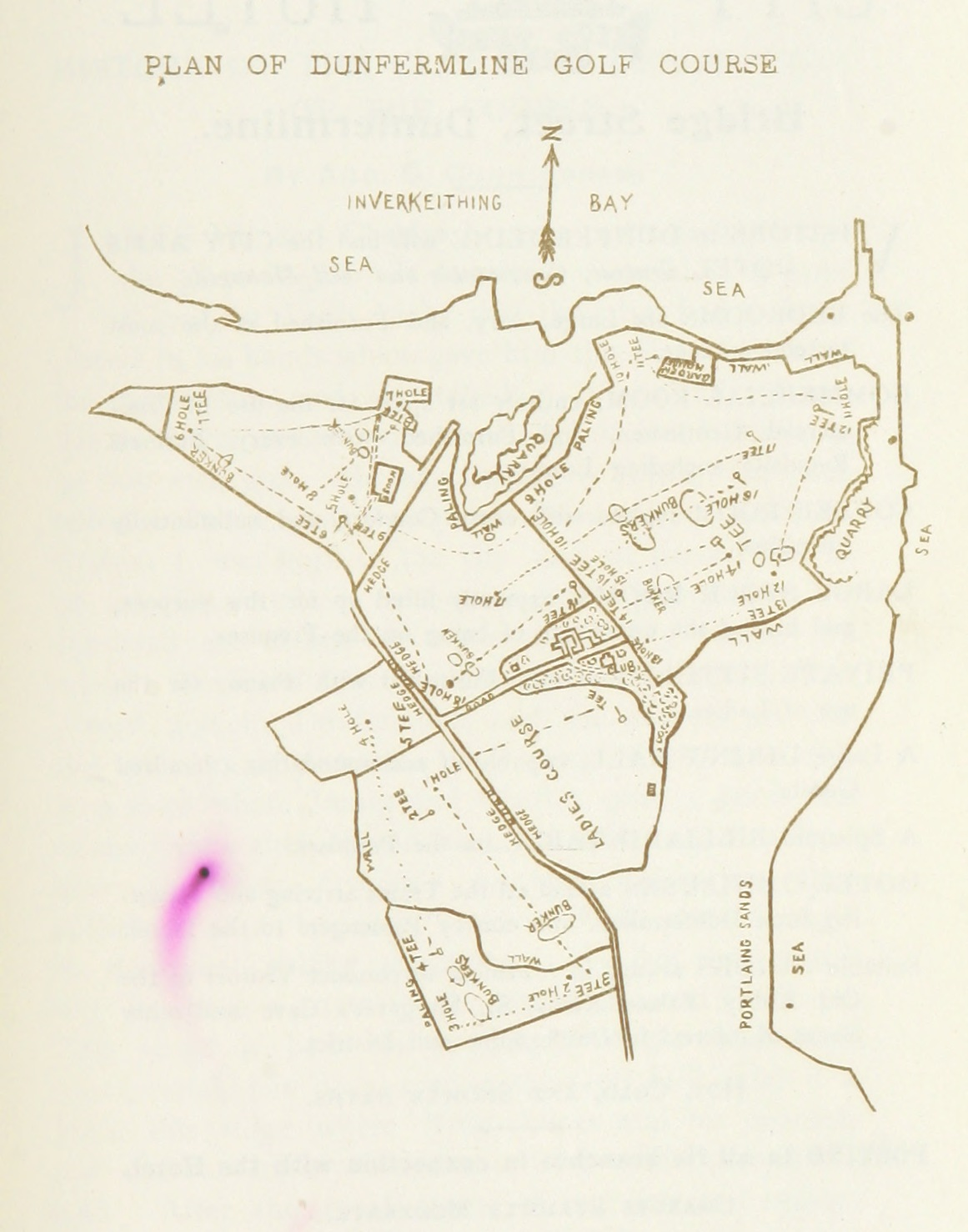
Map of the former Dunfermline (Jamestown) Golf course.

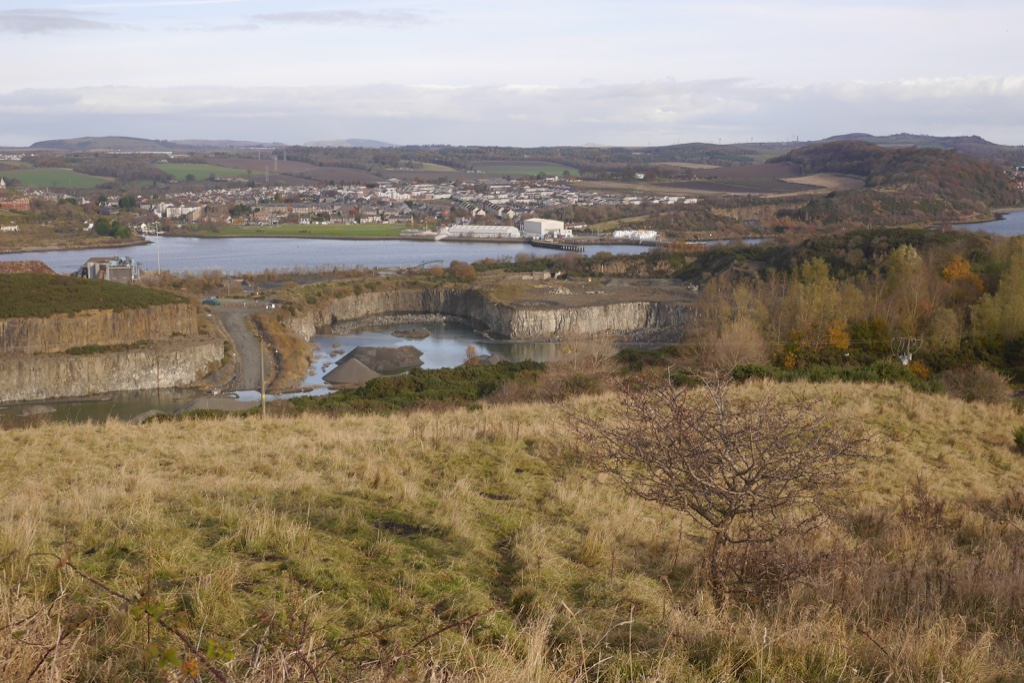
Part of Ferryhills SSSI with Jamestown's Cruicks Quarry in background.

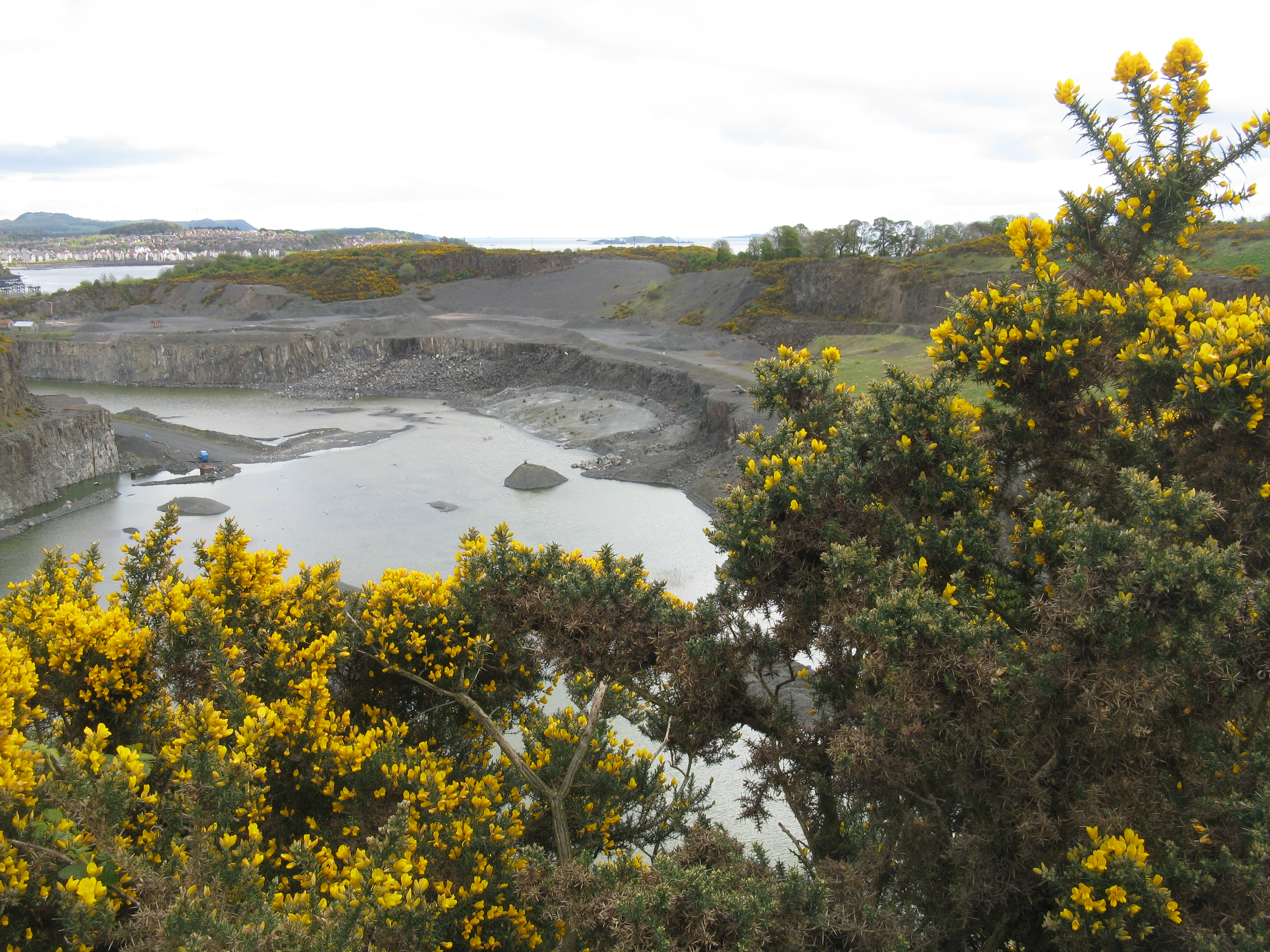
Cruicks Quarry, looking east.

== History ==
=== Medieval era ===
In 1270, a group of Jews made an unsuccessful application to Alexander III, who was then resident in Inverkeithing, to settle in Jamestown and establish a New Jerusalem. They proposed to fortify the peninsula and form harbours. The application was rejected on the grounds the land had been granted to the Royal Burgh of Inverkeithing.

=== 19th – 20th centuries ===
A quarantine Lazaretto, Inverkeithing Lazaretto, sat in the west of Jamestown between 1810 and 1835.

In the 1850s, the Ordnance Survey described Jamestown as "a cluster of cottage houses occupied by workmen employed in the different quarries in the neighbourhood". In the 19th century, Jamestown developed industries in chemical works and brick works. Jamestown also began extraction at Cruicks Quarry.

In the 19th and 20th century, Jamestown was popular with Irish dockworkers, and served those who worked in nearby Rosyth dockyard. There was formerly a Roman Catholic chapel in Jamestown, built to serve the many Irish dockworkers who came to the area. Opened in 1913 and dedicated to St Peter in Chains, it was replaced by St Peter in Chains Church, Inverkeithing in 1977. The area's Irish heritage is referenced in the name of Shamrock Terrace, a block of tenements at the bottom of Ferryhills Road.

During the First World War, the portion of Cruicks next to Inverkeithing Bay, along with the adjacent part of the Bay, was acquired by the Admiralty for the proposed construction of a submarine depot.

==== Shipbreaking ====
In 1921, Thomas Ward and Sons shipbreakers took over an old brick works in Jamestown and began operations. In the years that followed, many famous ships were broken at Jamestown including:

- The battleship HMS Dreadnought in 1923.
- The hull of the Titanic's sister ship RMS Olympic in 1937
- The Nazi Party cruise ship Robert Ley in 1947
- The RMS Mauretania in 1966.

Today, Robertson's metal recycling operate in Jamestown processing and exporting metal.

Ships dismantled at Inverkeithing display, Robertson's Metals, Jamestown.

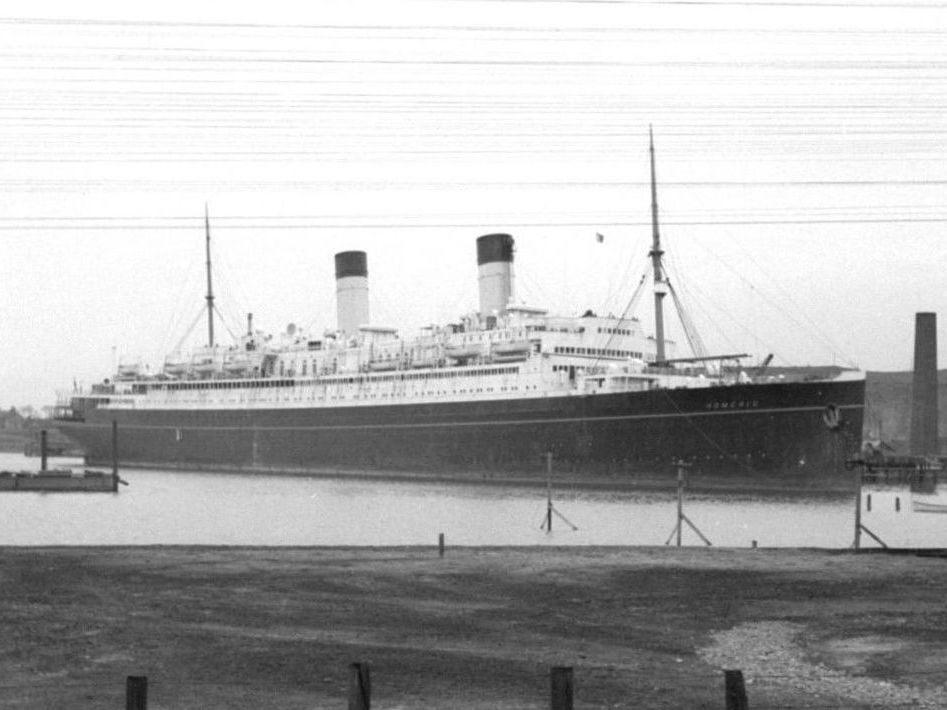
RMS Homeric arriving in Jamestown for breaking.

Hull of RMS Olympic being towed to Jamestown.

== Landmarks ==
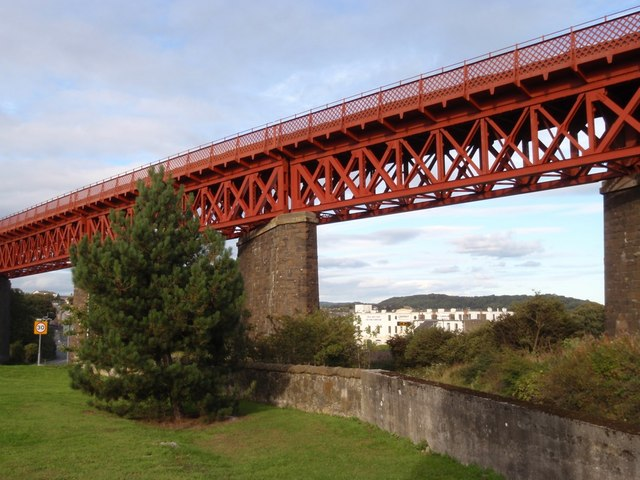
The Jamestown Viaduct, constructed between 1887 and 1890 for the Forth Bridge, crosses over Jamestown.

Jamestown's prominent Naval Base Mansions (right) were built in 1909 to house labourers from the dockyard at Rosyth. The building is B-listed, and was used as a furniture store, although by 2026 it is unused.
