= Jamestown Viaduct =

Bridge in Fife, Scotland

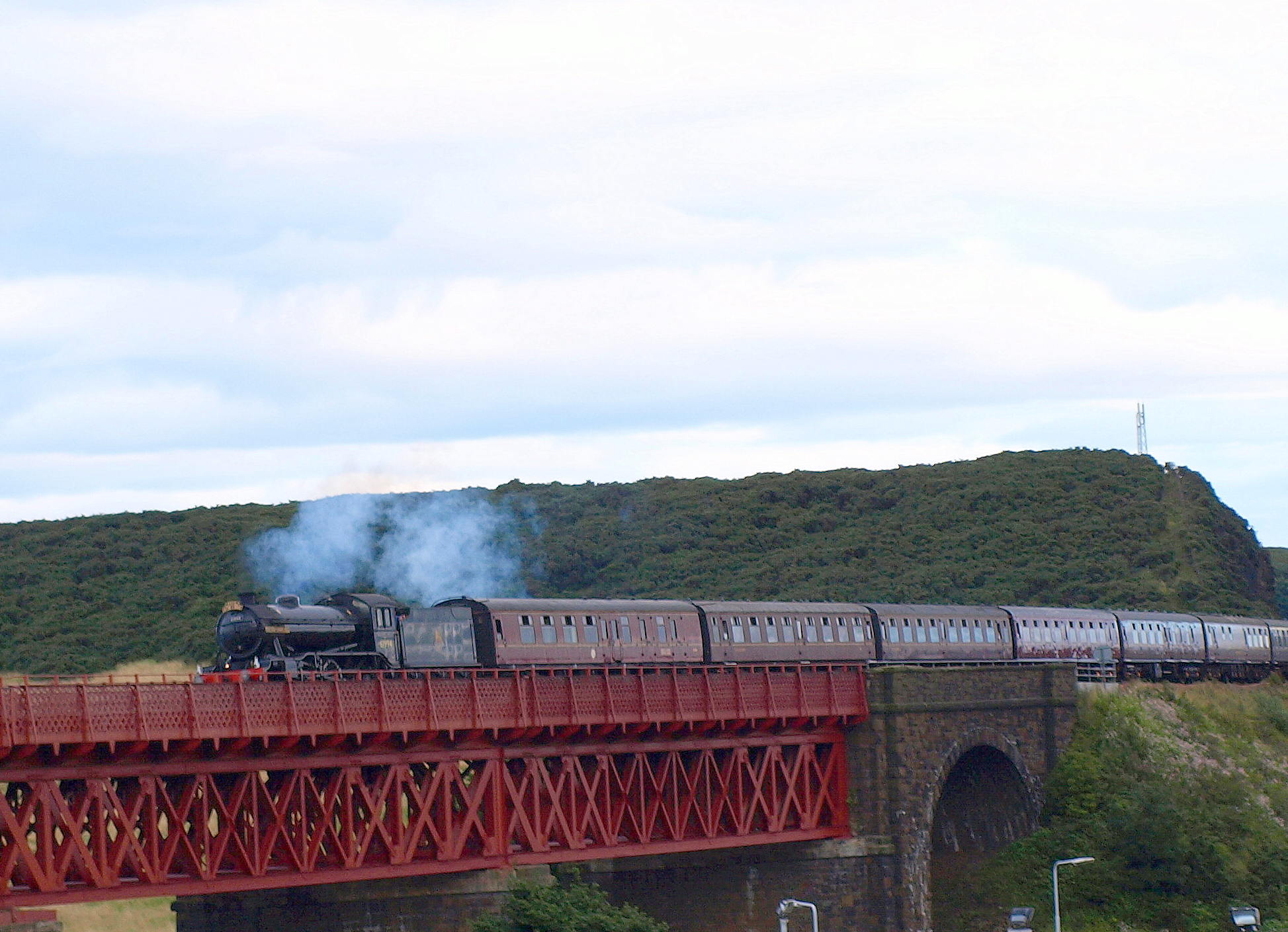
- The Great Marquess crossing Jamestown Viaduct near the Inverkeithing terminus of the SRPS "Forth Circle" special service on 22 August 2010.
- Coordinates: 56.02297°N 3.40525°W
- OS grid reference: NT 12509 82009
- Carries: Edinburgh to Aberdeen Line
- Crosses: B981

Characteristics
- Material: Steel
- Longest span: 33.4 metres (110 ft)
- No. of spans: 2 stone arches, 4 steel spans

History
- Opened: 1890

Listed Building – Category B
- Official name: Jamestown, Forth Bridge, North Approach Railway Viaduct
- Designated: 10 February 2004
- Reference no.: LB49652

Location
- Interactive map of Jamestown Viaduct

The Jamestown Viaduct is part of the northern approach to the Forth Bridge in Scotland. It crosses Inverkeithing, over the hamlet of Jamestown, and the village of North Queensferry in Fife.

== History ==
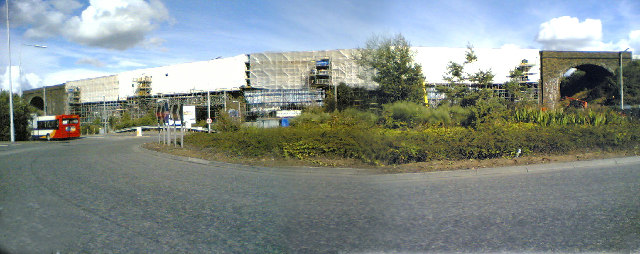
The viaduct during restoration work

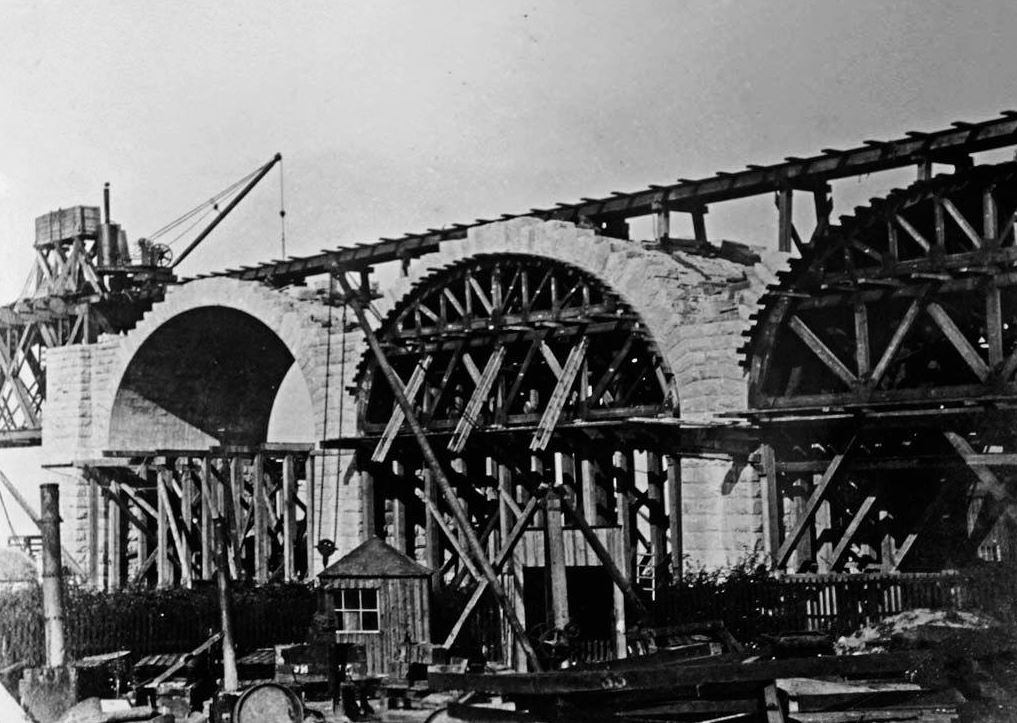
Building of the Jamestown Viaduct, 1889.

It was constructed between 1887 and 1890, and listed as a Grade B listed building in 2004.

In 2005, the viaduct was strengthened during an eight-day closure of the railway. 120 tonnes (118.1 long tons; 132.3 short tons) of steel and 600 cubic metres (21,000 cu ft) of high strength concrete were used to add a reinforced concrete slab underneath the track, in order to improve the load-carrying capacity to Network Rail's standards. The work was worth around £5 million, and engineered by Corus and carried out by Mowlem. 20,000 man-hours were worked during the period of closure, which coincided with a "possession" of the Forth Bridge.

== Design ==
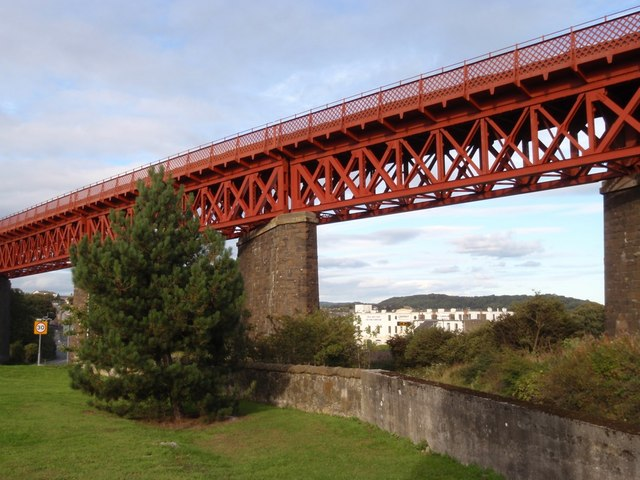
The viaduct is a skew arch - note that the truss girders are not continuous

It has four main steel girder spans, supported by three sandstone piers. As well as the four steel spans, there is a stone arch at each end of the viaduct. The steel spans are 33.4 metres (110 ft) long, and are at a skew of 70° The spans consist of twin truss girders sitting on the piers, and on top of the truss cross-girders supporting steel deck plates, with a ballasted track.

The viaduct carries the line crossing the Forth Bridge, from Edinburgh to Aberdeen and the north of Scotland, and carries a significant volume of both passenger and freight rail traffic, which previously included transporting coal to Longannet Power Station prior to its closure in 2016. As of 2006 there were up to 200 train movements a day and loads of 27 million tonnes annually.

It spans the B981 public road and the former branch railway to North Queensferry and Rosyth. It runs close to and nearly parallel to the A90 road, but the viaduct has a slight curve to the east.

== See also ==
- List of bridges in Scotland
