= List of listed buildings in Dalgety, Fife =

This is a list of listed buildings in the parish of Dalgety in Fife, Scotland.

== List ==
Name	Location	Date listed	Grid ref. (Note: Sometimes known as OSGB36, the grid reference (where provided) is based on the British national grid reference system used by the Ordnance Survey. • "Guide to National Grid". Ordnance Survey. • "Get-a-map". Ordnance Survey.)	Geo-coordinates	Notes	LB number (Note: Historic Environment Scotland assign a unique alphanumeric identifier to each designated site in Scotland, for listed buildings this always begins with "LB", for example "LB12345".)	Image
St Colme, Coachhouse And Walled Garden, Including Gates				56°02′40″N 3°18′52″W	Category B	6616	Upload Photo
Donibristle House				56°01′53″N 3°20′58″W	Category A	3647	Upload another image
Mount Laura Tower				56°03′21″N 3°20′18″W	Category C(S)	3656	Upload another image
Donibristle Ice-House				56°01′59″N 3°21′20″W	Category B	3651	Upload Photo
Fordell Chapel				56°03′12″N 3°22′19″W	Category A	3653	Upload Photo
Donibristle Chapel				56°01′50″N 3°21′08″W	Category A	3650	Upload another image See more images
Fordell Castle				56°03′13″N 3°22′16″W	Category A	3652	Upload another image
Cockairnie House				56°03′09″N 3°20′09″W	Category B	3657	Upload Photo
'Ardmhor' (Formerly Dalgety Manse)				56°02′43″N 3°20′06″W	Category C(S)	3665	Upload Photo
Vantage Farm Fordell Estate Coach House, Dairy, Dairy Cottage, Granary And Gate Piers				56°03′21″N 3°21′55″W	Category C(S)	3662	Upload Photo
St Colme House Sundial				56°02′39″N 3°18′48″W	Category B	6617	Upload Photo
Fordell Sun-Dial				56°03′14″N 3°22′15″W	Category C(S)	3654	Upload another image
Otterston Tower				56°03′11″N 3°20′31″W	Category C(S)	3659	Upload Photo
Donibristle Estate Boundary Wall And Fordell Railway				56°02′21″N 3°21′36″W	Category C(S)	43861	Upload Photo
Dalgety Bay, Gardens Cottage				56°02′13″N 3°21′28″W	Category C(S)	3648	Upload Photo
Lochside Cottages, Otterston Loch				56°03′09″N 3°20′20″W	Category C(S)	3658	Upload Photo
Vantage Farm Fordell Estate Dovecot				56°03′19″N 3°21′56″W	Category B	3663	Upload another image
Dalgety Kirk				56°02′48″N 3°20′20″W	Category B	3664	Upload another image
Barns Farmhouse				56°02′39″N 3°20′18″W	Category C(S)	3666	Upload Photo
St Colme House				56°02′40″N 3°18′49″W	Category B	6615	Upload another image
Donibristle Stables				56°01′57″N 3°20′46″W	Category B	3649	Upload another image
Ansonhill House				56°05′00″N 3°21′42″W	Category B	3655	Upload Photo
Markfield Tower				56°03′00″N 3°20′37″W	Category C(S)	3660	Upload Photo

== Key ==
The scheme for classifying buildings in Scotland is:

- Category A: "buildings of national or international importance, either architectural or historic; or fine, little-altered examples of some particular period, style or building type."
- Category B: "buildings of regional or more than local importance; or major examples of some particular period, style or building type, which may have been altered."
- Category C: "buildings of local importance; lesser examples of any period, style, or building type, as originally constructed or moderately altered; and simple traditional buildings which group well with other listed buildings."

In March 2016 there were 47,288 listed buildings in Scotland. Of these, 8% were Category A, and 50% were Category B, with the remaining 42% being Category C.

== See also ==
- List of listed buildings in Fife
