= Letham Hill =

Coastal hill in Scotland

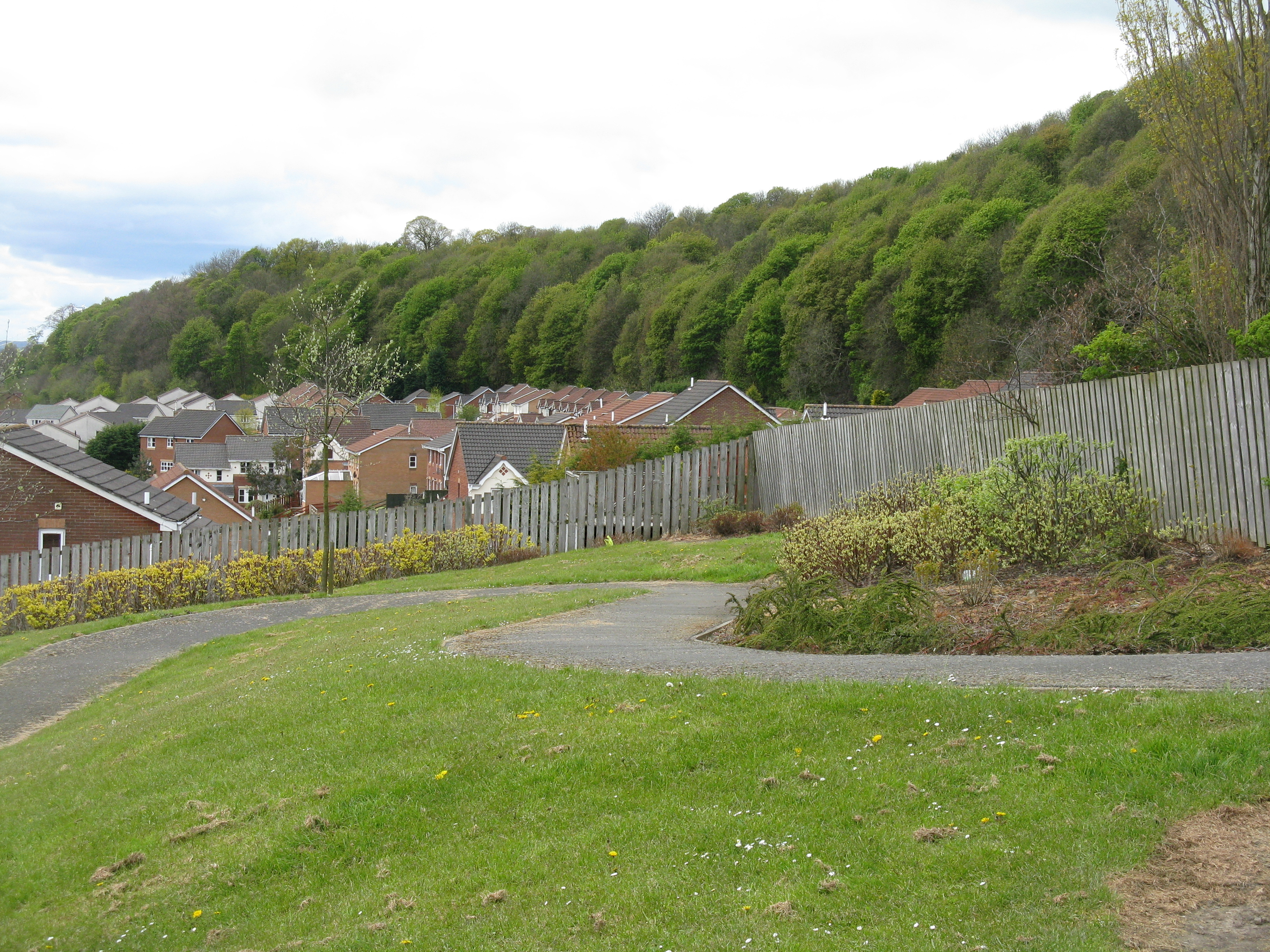
- Houses under Letham Hill Woods.

Highest point
- Elevation: 99 m (325 ft)
- Coordinates: 56°02′17″N 3°22′15″W

Geography
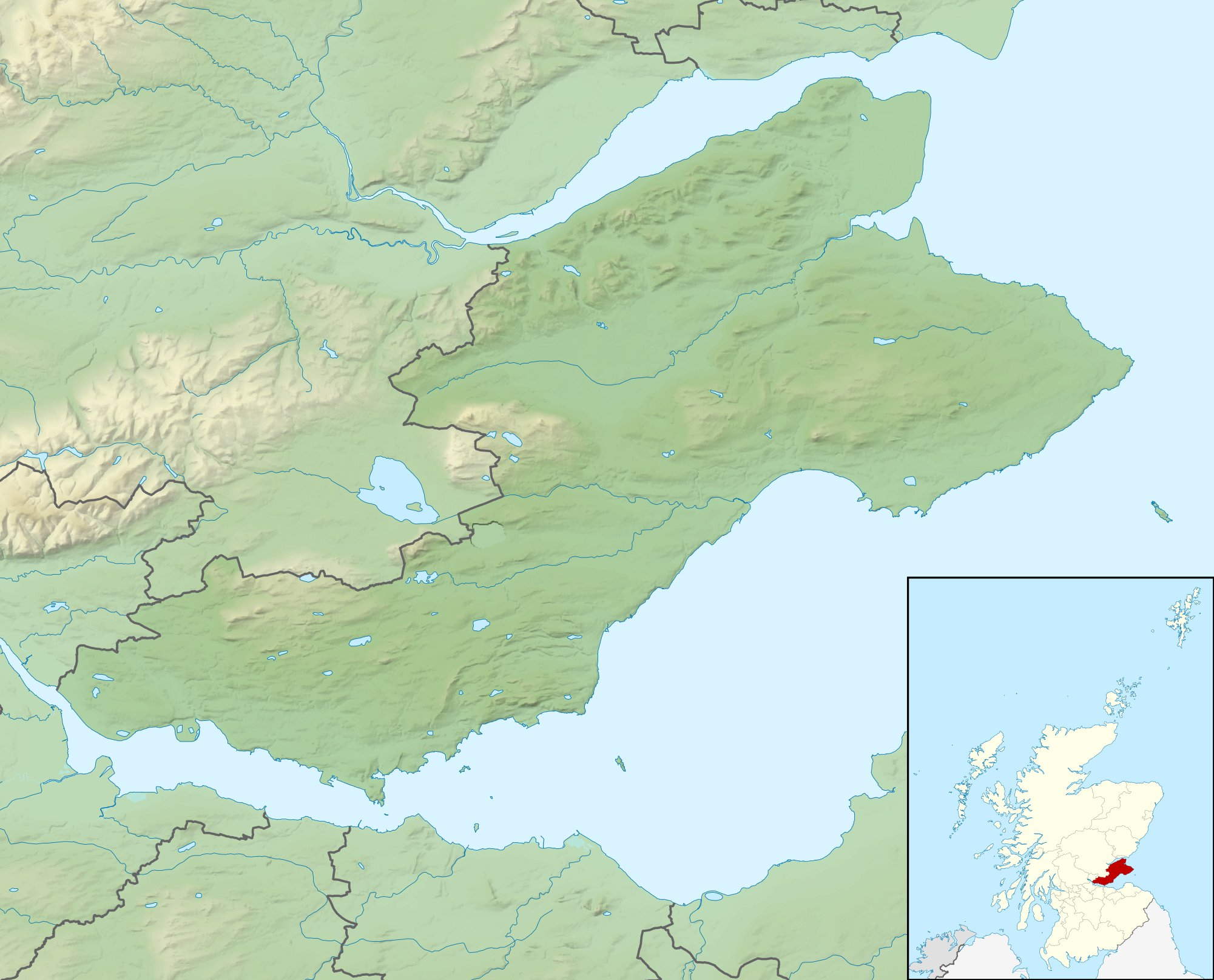
- Location within Fife
- Location: Fife, Scotland, United Kingdom
- OS grid: NT 14682 83637
- Topo map: OS Landranger 65

Letham Hill is a coastal hill located between the towns of Inverkeithing and Dalgety Bay in Fife, Scotland. It stands 324 ft (99m) above sea level.

== Features ==
NatureScot have categorised Letham Hill into the "Coastal Hills - Fife" category of mainly glacial hills. Letham Hill is steep sided and runs approximately north–south.

The hill is largely covered by deciduous woodland, forming Letham Hill wood. Despite forest cover, Letham Hill features sweeping views of the Firth of Forth.

== History ==
According to Rev A. Robinson (1836), there are the remains of a Druid temple atop Letham Hill, in the form of "large stones placed in a circular form".

The name Letham likely originates from the Gaelic word Leathan, meaning broad. This was a common Gaelic word used to describe the shape of hills.

The summit of Letham Hill was originally marked by a trig point according to the first edition of the 6 inch OS map, however is now marked simply by a socket stone.

== Access to the Summit ==
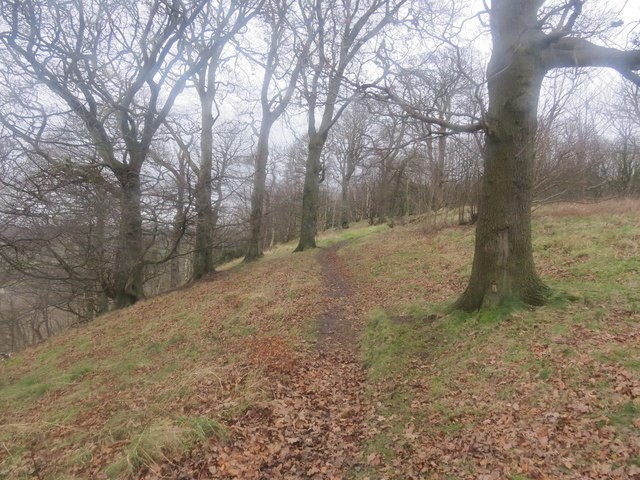
Pathway through Letham Hill Wood.

The summit is easily reached using a core path through the woods; this path can be accessed from the south at the Fife Coastal Path running between Inverkeithing and Dalgety Bay, or from the A921 at the north of the hill.
