= James Simson (author) =

Scottish author born 1826

James Simson, born 1826, was a Scottish author, known for his works on Scottish gypsies, the puritan preacher John Bunyan, his biography of Charles Waterton; and for his first hand account of time spent in his childhood on a Lazaretto at Inverkeithing in Fife, Scotland.

== Early life ==
James Simpson was born on January 4, 1826 in Inverkeithing in Fife, Scotland, to Walter Simpson. He spent much of his childhood at the Inverkeithing Lazaretto, a quarantine ship and one of only two in Scotland, before its decommissioning in 1835.

== Publications ==
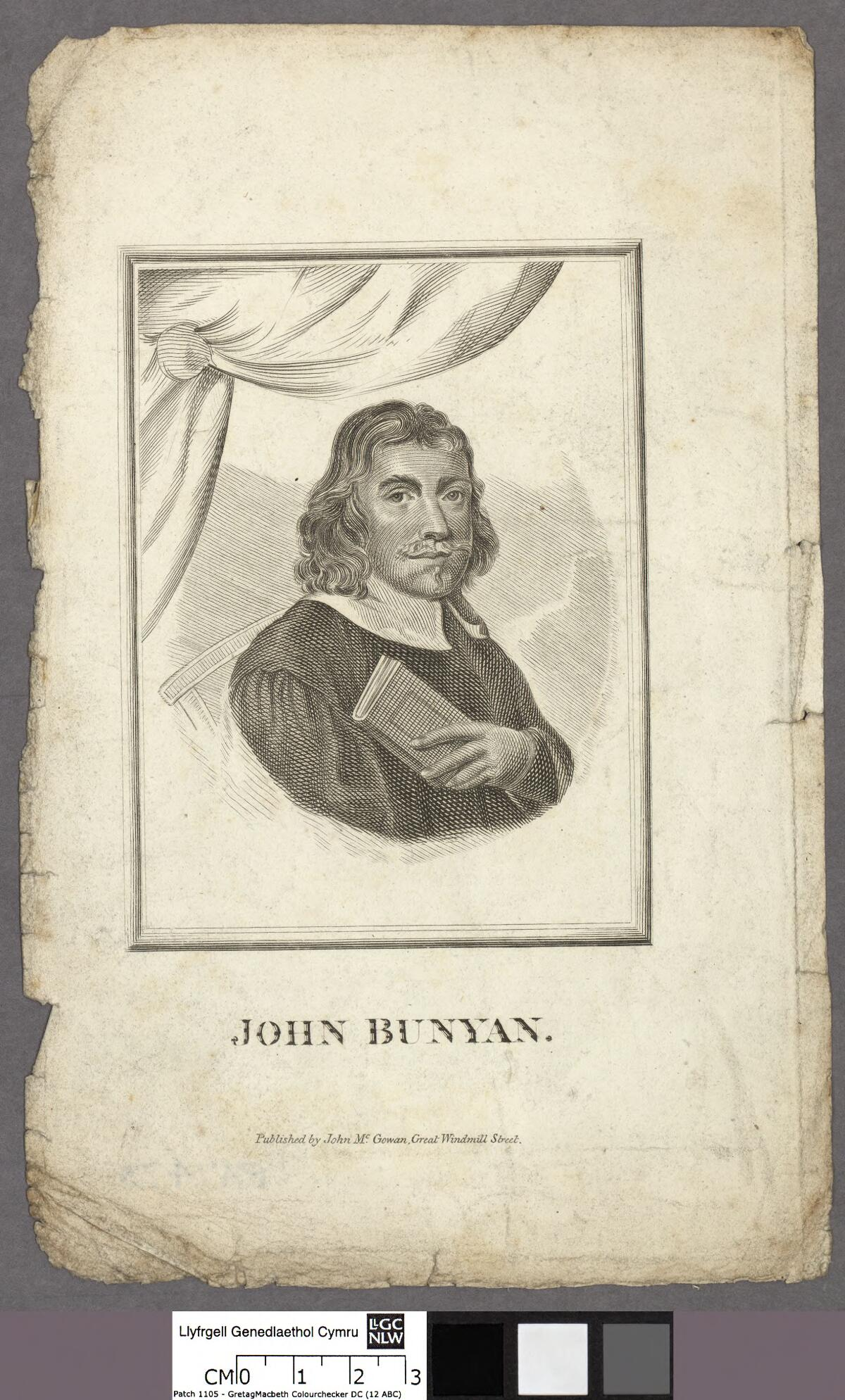
John Bunyan, 17th century Puritan preacher and author.

=== Gypsies ===
Simson's works often looked at Scottish Gypsies. In 1866, Simson edited and published his father Walter Simpsons work "History of Gypsies, with specimens of the Gypsy language". The work was published in New York and London. In 1881 he wrote the work "The Scottish Churches and the Gypsies". In 1883 he illustrated "The Gypsies"; and in 1884, he wrote "The Social Emancipation of the Gypsies".

=== John Bunyan ===
Simson was interested in the 17th century Puritan preacher and author John Bunyan, and in 1880 wrote "The English Universities and John Bunyan and the Encyclopædia Britannica and the gipsies". In 1882 Simson followed this with his work "Was John Bunyan a Gypsy?" (1882).

=== Life at a Lazaretto ===
In 1882, James Simson also published his well known work, titled "Reminisces of Childhood at Inverkeithing, or, Life at a Lazaretto". The work was published in New York by James Miller; in Edinburgh by Maclachlan & Stewart; and London by Bailliere, Tyndall & Co.

=== Other works ===
Around 1878, Simson published "Contributions to Natural History and Papers on Other Subjects".

In 1880, James Simson published a biography of the English naturalist and explorer Charles Waterton, entitled "Charles Waterton".
