= Dalgety Bay =

Town in Fife, Scotland

Coordinates: 56.04295°N 3.36755°W

Dalgety Bay: Scottish Gaelic: Bàgh Dhealgadaidh; Scots: Dalgety Bay
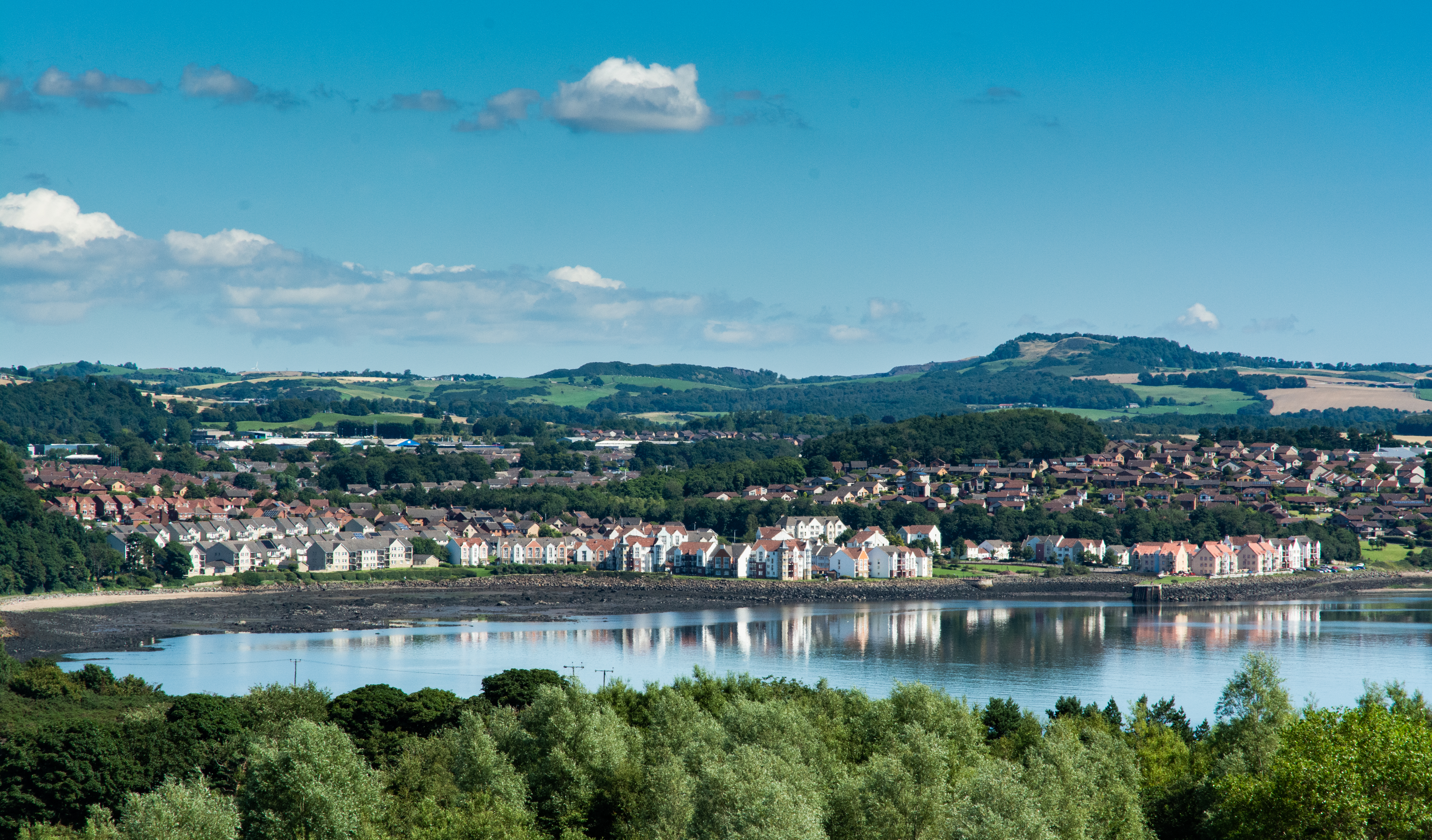
- View of Dalgety Bay from North Queensferry across Inverkeithing Bay

- Location within Fife
- Population: 9,710 (2020)
- OS grid reference: NT149841
  - Edinburgh: 8.5 mi (13.7 km)
  - London: 339 mi (546 km)
- Council area: Fife
- Lieutenancy area: Fife
- Country: Scotland
- Sovereign state: United Kingdom
- Post town: Dunfermline
- Postcode district: KY11
- Dialling code: 01383
- Police: Scotland
- Fire: Scottish
- Ambulance: Scottish
- UK Parliament: Cowdenbeath and Kirkcaldy
- Scottish Parliament: Cowdenbeath

Dalgety Bay (/dælˈɡɛti ˈbeɪ/) is a coastal town and parish in Fife, Scotland, on the north shore of the Firth of Forth, nine miles (14 kilometres) from Edinburgh city centre. The civil parish is the eighth-largest in Fife, with a population of 9,710 in 2020.

Dalgety bay was named after the original village of Dalgety, evident by the ruins of the 12th century St Bridget's Kirk. The root of the place-name Dalgety is the Scottish Gaelic word dealg, 'thorn', and the full name originally meant 'the place of the thorn[-bushes]'. The new town, of which building started in 1965, takes its name from the main bay it adjoins, but the town stretches over many bays and coves including Inverkeithing Bay, Donibristle Bay and St David's Bay.

Dalgety Bay is a commuter town and around 30% of the towns' workers work in Edinburgh. While the architecture of the town reflects construction by volume housebuilders, the town is a regular winner of the Best Kept Small Town title. Dalgety Bay has 26 Historic Scotland Listed Buildings or structures, and features on the Fife Coastal Path, one of Scotland's Great Trails.

== Geography ==
Dalgety Bay is nearly contiguous with Inverkeithing, separated by Letham Hill to the west. The closest city to Dalgety Bay is Dunfermline, 3 miles north. Edinburgh is 9 miles southeast.

Hillend is a village in the northwest of Dalgety Bay, administratively part of the town.

The town lies on the north shore of the Firth of Forth and stretches over many bays and coves. At its furthest east is Inverkeithing Bay, followed by St David's Bay and Donbristle Bay, and its furthest west is Dalgety Bay.

== History ==
Dalgety Bay began as the village of Dalgety, which was built on the site of the 12th century St Bridget's Kirk.The land surrounding the town was part of the estate owned by the Earls of Moray who built Donibristle House as their residence. In 1592 James Stewart, 2nd Earl of Moray was murdered on the seashore near Donibristle by his rival George Gordon, Earl of Huntly, which is remembered in the popular ballad The Bonnie Earl O' Moray.

Towards the end of the 18th century, the village was destroyed by order of the Earls of Moray and the inhabitants dispersed. During the First World War Morton Gray Stuart, 17th Earl of Moray donated a portion of his land to the Crown, which built an airfield there in 1917 as a base for the Royal Naval Air Service. The town also sent 30 men into the First World War, with only eight returning unharmed. The Royal Naval Air Service improved and expanded the aerodrome during the Second World War as HMS Merlin, an air station, and constructed an extensive aircraft maintenance facility there.

Construction of the modern town of Dalgety Bay as Scotland's first "enterprise town" began around 1965 on the site of RNAS Donibristle and much of the remaining ground of the Earls of Moray family seat, Donibristle House. The town stretches across several bays and coves of the northern coast of the Firth of Forth including Donibristle Bay and St David's Bay.

A series of radioactive objects have been found on the shoreline of Dalgety Bay since the 1990s. The objects come from an eroded landfill that contains debris from Second World War aircraft that originally had radium dials. In September 2023, SEPA announced that the operation to remove the contamination had been successfully completed and that the relevant stretch of shoreline was now safe for public access for the first time since 2011. Some 6,500 radioactive particles, mostly of low activity, had been removed, with a purpose-built scanner being used to detect the particles.

== Education ==
There are two primary schools in Dalgety Bay: Dalgety Bay Primary School and Donibristle Primary School. Dalgety Bay sits within the catchment area for Inverkeithing High School.

== Twin towns – sister cities ==
Ócsa, Hungary
