= Hillend, Fife =

Hillend
- Village
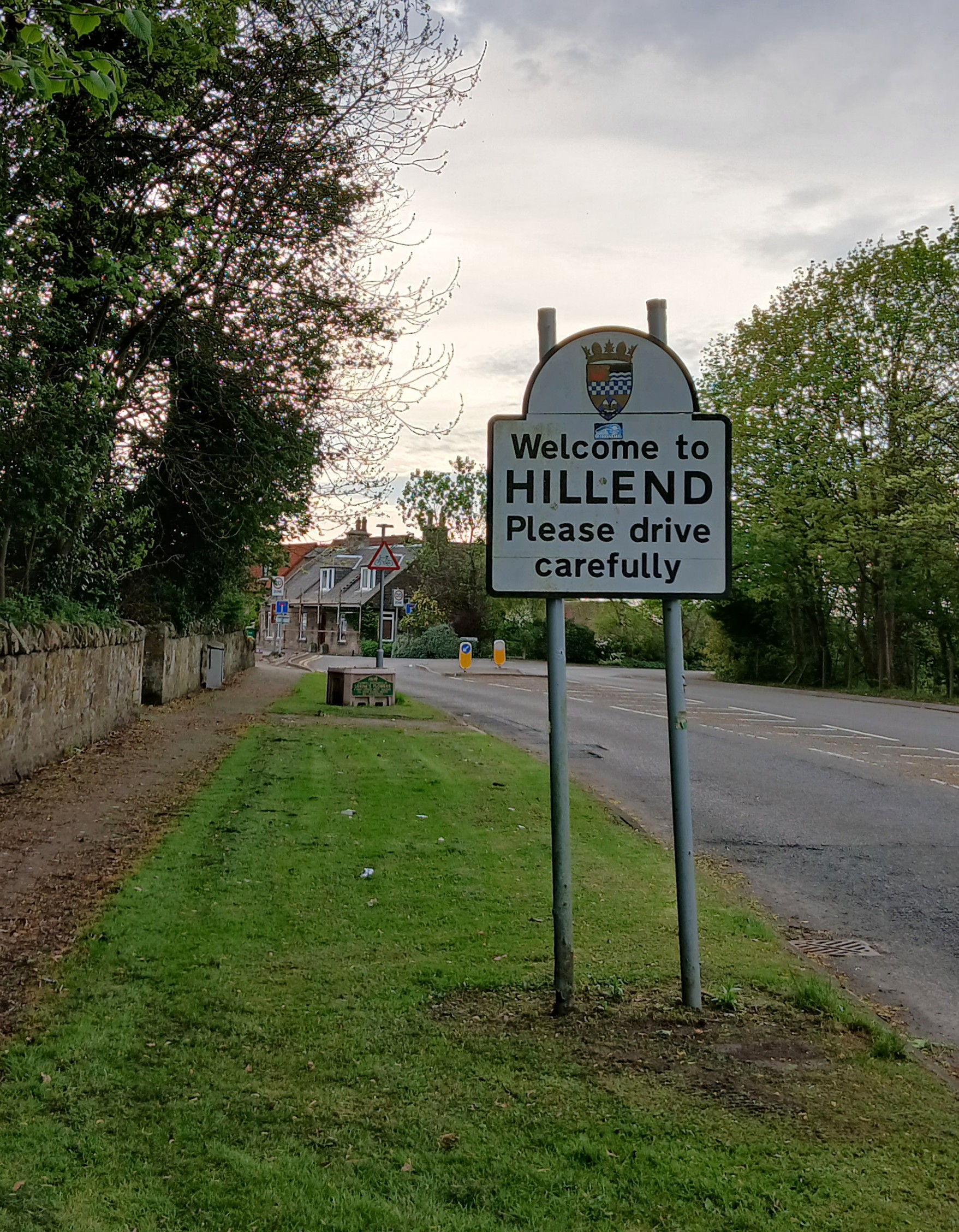
- Hillend Village welcome sign
- Population: 217
  - Edinburgh: 10 mi (16 km)
  - London: 340 mi (550 km)
- Country: Scotland
- Sovereign state: United Kingdom
- Police: Scotland
- Fire: Scottish
- Ambulance: Scottish

Hillend is a village in Fife, Scotland, to the east of Inverkeithing and to the west of Dalgety Bay. The village is 9.5 miles (15.3 km) northwest of Edinburgh city centre.

The village had a population of 217 in 2001.

== History ==
The village was named by 1775 as Hillend, as the town occupies a position at the north end of Letham Hill, the natural border between the towns of Inverkeithing and Dalgety Bay. Hillend was known as a linen weaving village.

In 1821, the population of Hillend was measured at 279. Much employment for the village was at a nearby whinstone quarry.

Hillend was described in 1882 by, Frances Groome in Ordnance Gazetteer of Scotland as:

A village in Inverkeithing and Dalgety parishes, Fife, 1¼ mile NE of Inverkeithing town. It has a post office under Inverkeithing and a public school.

In the 3rd statistical account of Fife (1952), Hillend village was described as:

This little community comprises one short street of cottages, on the main high road from Aberdour to Inverkeithing and about one mile from the latter town. There are a school with one teacher, one small shop and a tavern.

In the 1950s, most of the houses in Hillend were occupied by people working at the naval air station of Donbristle.

Historically, Hillend village has been under the same parish and administrative boundary as neighbouring Inverkeithing. Since 1975, Hillend is governed under Dalgety Bay and Hillend Community Council.

Hillend had a bypass built and opened in 1993, now the A921.

== Landmarks ==
The following are some landmarks of Hillend:

- Hillend playground.
- Hillend Cemetery.
- The Hillend Tavern pub.
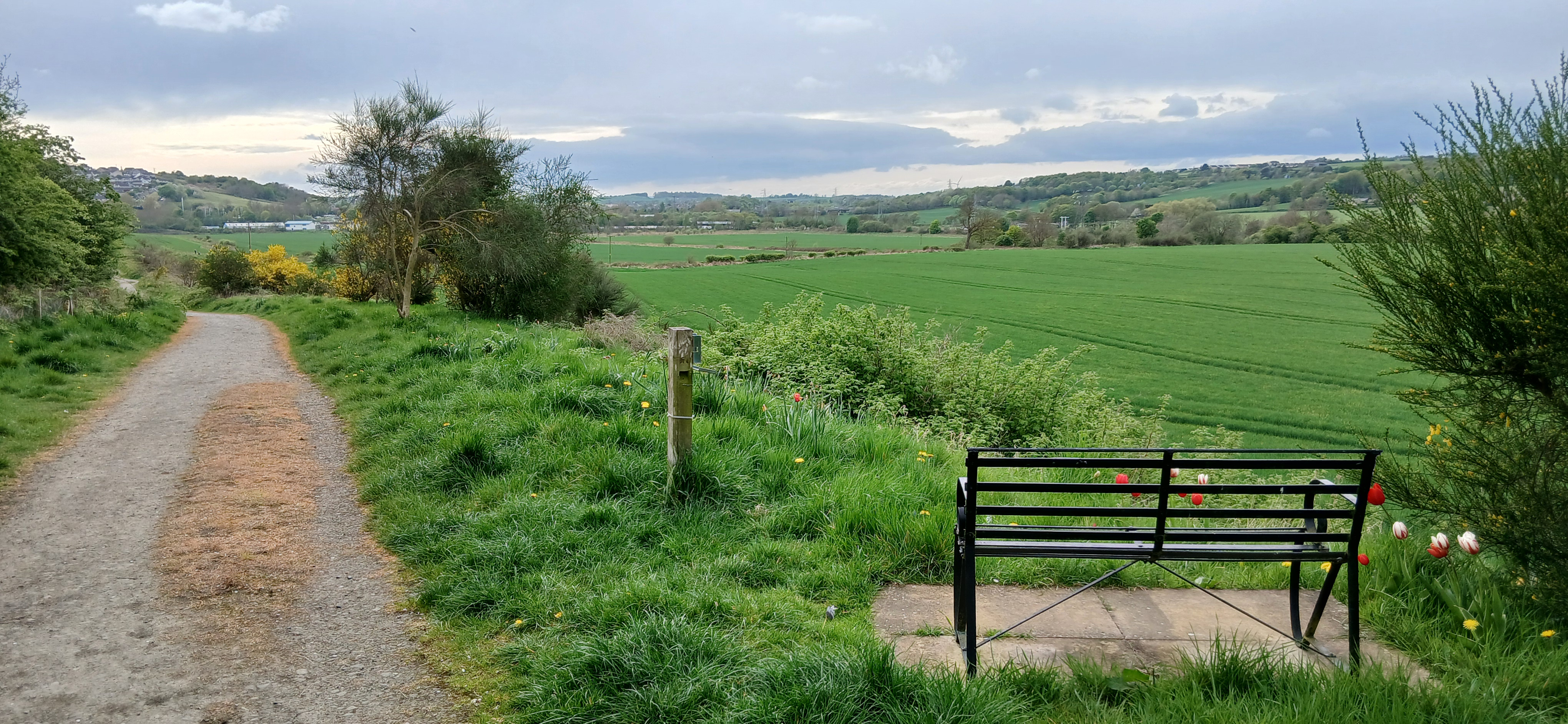
Hillend Sunset View Bench.

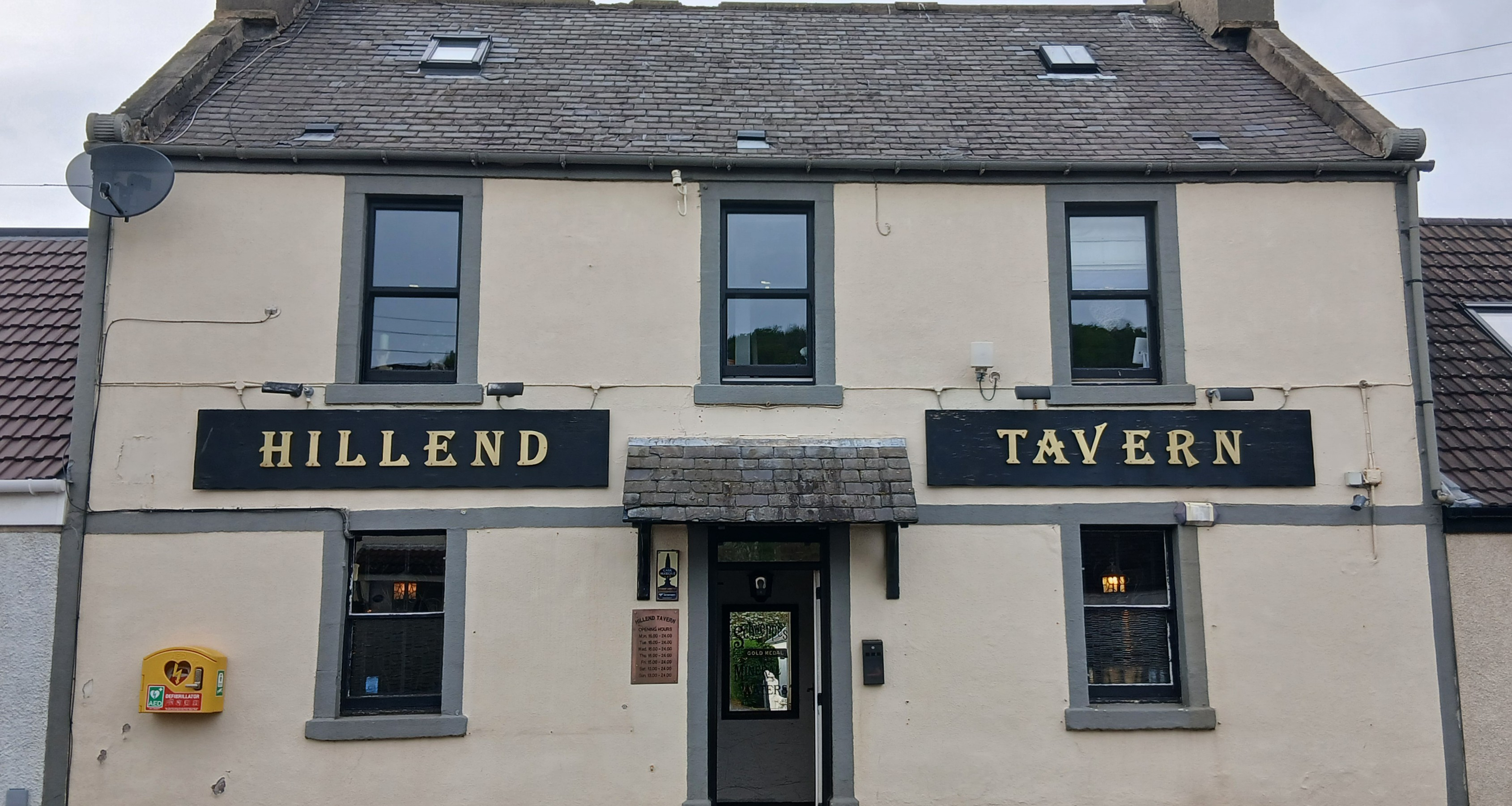
Hillend Tavern pub, a category C listed building, within the village since the 19th century.

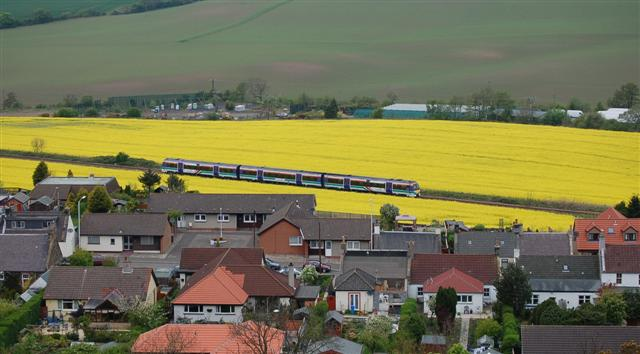
Hillend with railway in the background.
