= Timeline of Inverkeithing =

The following is a timeline of the history of Inverkeithing in Fife, Scotland.

== 1st century ==
- 79 AD - 87 AD - During the Roman Conquest of Britain, it is likely Governor Agricola established an encampment in the Inverkeithing area during his war against the Caledonians.

== 5th century ==
- According to local legend, St Erat - a follower of St Ninian - founds a church in Inverkeithing.

== 12th century ==
- 1114 - Inverkeithing is mentioned in the foundation charter of Scone Abbey granted by Alexander I; this is the earliest surviving documentation of Inverkeithing.
- 1161 - Inverkeithing is mentioned as an existing Royal Burgh.
- 1163 - Pope Alexander III summons the clergy of Inverkeithing to the British Isles Council of Tours.
- 1196 - A hostel for pilgrims in Inverkeithing is documented as a possession of Dryburgh Abbey.

== 13th century ==
- 24 August 1244 - Inverkeithing's medieval church was consecrated to St. Peter by Bishop de Bernham.
- 1270 - A colony of Jews makes an unsuccessful application to Alexander III to settle at Inverkeithing.
- 1282 - According to the Lanercrost Chronicle, a scandal of Inverkeithing parish priest. At Easter, the priest "revived the profane rites of Priapus, collecting young girls from the villages, and compelling them to dance in circles to the honour of Father Bacchus, [...] singing and dancing himself and stirring them to lust by filthy language." When the priest exhibited similar behaviour during Lent, a scandalised citizen stabbed him to death.
- 19 March 1286 - King Alexander III is last seen in Inverkeithing, before dying in a storm on route to Kinghorn.
- 28 August 1296 - 13 burgess of Inverkeithing swear fealty to King Edward I of England.

== 14th century ==
- 2nd March 1304 - King Edward I of England, known as the Hammer of the Scots, stays in Inverkeithing on his return to Scotland during the First War of Scottish Independence.
- Autumn 1316 - King Robert the Bruce issues two charters from Inverkeithing.
- 1342 - David II holds a justice ayre in Inverkeithing.
- April 1354 - The Parliament of Scotland meets at Inverkeithing, and discusses the terms of David II's return from captivity following the Battle of Neville's Cross.
- 1362 - A skirmish of the Rebellion of the Three Earls took place at Inverkeithing between rebels and Royalist forces, the main body of which was led by David II in person. The earl proved the victor, and subsequently plundered the town.
- 1385 - Inverkeithing Franciscan Friary is mentioned to have been built.
- 1389 - Inverkeithing Mercat Cross is erected, likely marking the marriage between the Duke of Rothesay and the daughter of the Earl of Douglas.

== 15th century ==
- June 1409 - meeting in Inverkeithing of regent to James I, Robert Stewart, Duke of Albany, and Archibald Douglas to resolve a political dispute.
- 1423 - General Council held at Inverkeithing to discuss the terms of the return of King James I from English captivity.
- 1487 - Act of Parliament during the reign of James III specifies that the Convention of Royal Burghs will be held annually in Inverkeithing. It would be moved to Edinburgh in 1552.

== 16th century ==
- 1503 - an Act of Parliament charges the inhabitants of Inverkeithing with the building of a wall seaward with ports of stone and lime.
- 1503 - James I attends Inverkeithing Lammas Fair; he would do so again in 1508.
- November 1504 - following a plague scare at Dunfermline Palace, four African women including Ellen More, with John Mosman, the court apothecary, came to stay in Inverkeithing.
- 1535 - at the King's Council, representatives of Inverkeithing protest at the imposition of national stent on the grounds of poverty.
- 1557 - Inverkeithing town walls built.
- 1559 - Inverkeithing Friary is sold to a private buyer as part of the Scottish reformation.
- 1582 - the earliest mention of a schoolmaster in Inverkeithing; the earliest mention of a school is after its erection in 1675.
- 1598 - Inverkeithing is granted a charter of confirmation as a Royal Burgh by James VI.

== 17th century ==
- c. 1608/1609 - an epidemic of the plague breaks out in Inverkeithing.
- 1611 - the parishes of Inverkeithing and Rosyth were united.
- 1621 to 1655 - the Inverkeithing witch hunt, where at least 51 people are executed for witchcraft in Inverkeithing.
- 1646 - First mention of Inverkeithing Highland Games.
- 1648 - Inverkeithing Lammas Fair mentioned in Burgh records as “…a great day for fun, frolic, fit races, ale and drunken folks, gentle and simple”
- 20th July 1651 - the Battle of Inverkeithing takes place; the decisive final battle of the Wars of the Three Kingdoms in Scotland, giving Oliver Cromwell's forces control over Scotland.

== 18th century ==
- 23rd November 1706 - Address is presented to the Parliament of Scotland from the "Magistrates, Town Council, and inhabitants of Inverkeithing" against the proposed Act of Union.
- 9 April 1707 - The murder of Henry Stenhouse by Robert Balfour in a famous a crime of passion.
- 1707 - James Spittle, representing Inverkeithing, votes in favour of ratification of the Treaty of Union with England (see Acts of Union).
- 30th November 1735 - Samuel Grieg is born in Inverkeithing.
- 1752 - The Inverkeithing Case becomes a national issue throughout the Church of Scotland, and leads to a split in Inverkeithing's congregation and the founding of St John's Church.
- 1755 - Inverkeithing Town House is built.
- 1760 - the Inverkeithing Provostship election becomes void due to intimidation and bribery; the repeat election ends with victory for Francis Holburne.
- 1773 - Inverkeithing burgh council orders the ports of Inverkeithing town walls to be taken down.
- 1783 - The Halbeath Waggon Way opens, terminating at Inverkeithing harbour.
- 1795 - Whisky distillery in Inverkeithing is founded.

== 19th century ==
- 1825 - Fire destroys most of Inverkeithing Parish Church.
- 1833 - Inverkeithing Corn Exchange is built.
- 1835 - Lazaretto at Inverkeithing is decommissioned, after being constructed in the early 19th century.
- 6th September 1842 - Visit to Inverkeithing of Queen Victoria and Prince Albert.
- 1877 - Inverkeithing Railway station is opened.

== 20th century ==
- 1903 - St Peter's Episcopal Church is built.
- 1906 - Inverkeithing United F.C. is founded, and would win the 1912-1913 Scottish Junior Cup.
- 1914 to 1918 - 130 men from Inverkeithing die in WWI.
- 16 October 1939 - Battle of the River Forth takes place over Inverkeithing.
- 1939 to 1945 - 39 men and women of Inverkeithing die in WWII.
- 14 June 1945 - Radio Moscow broadcasts the accusation that a Polish government-in-exile concentration camp is operating at Inverkeithing.
- 1971 - Rock band Nazareth starts rehearsals in Inverkeithing.
- 1976 - Inverkeithing Community Council is founded.

== 21st century ==
- November 2000 - Ferrytoll Park and Ride is opened.
