= Inverkeithing Trust =

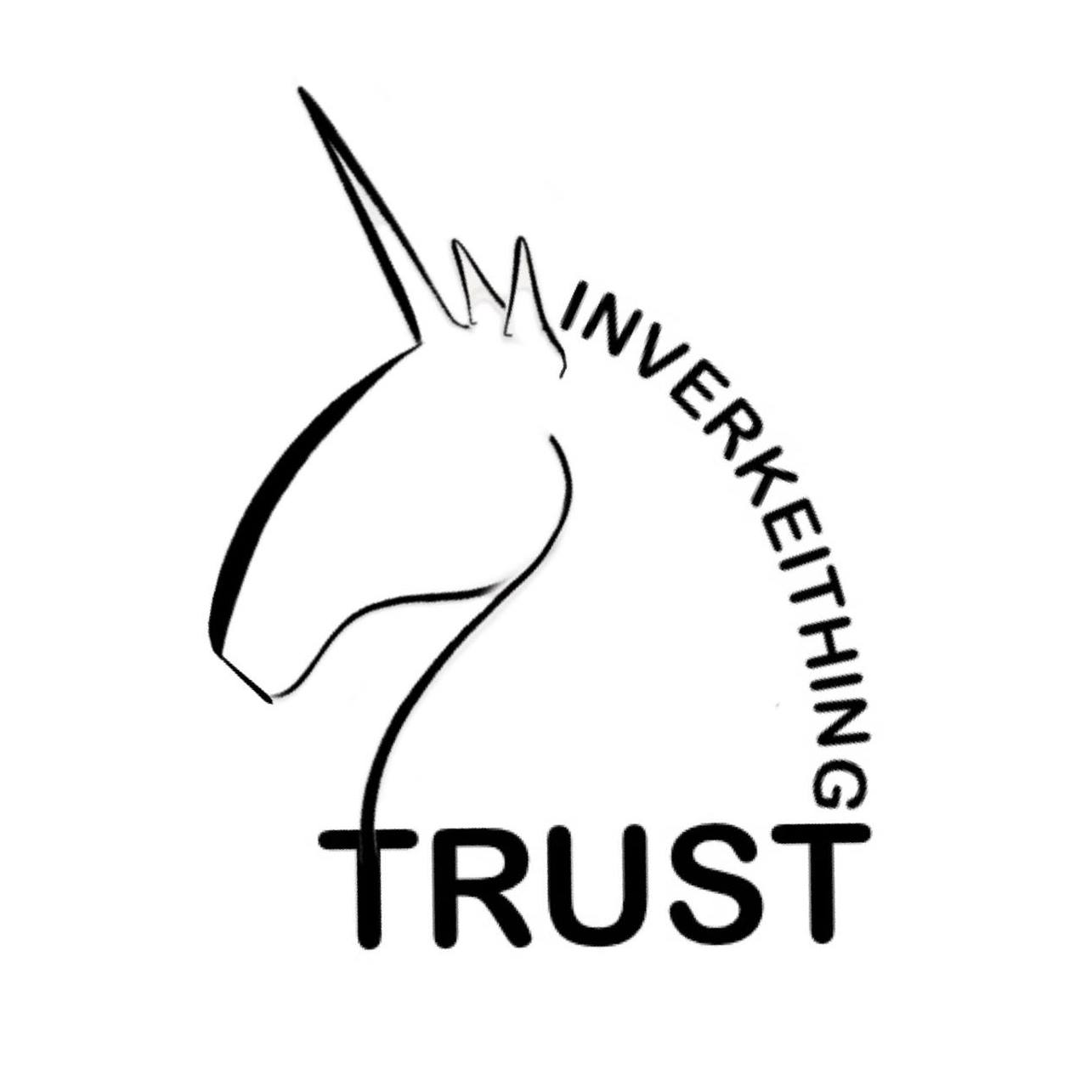
- Inverkeithing Trust logo (2026)
- Formation: 31 July 2020
- Registration no.: Company: CS004777 Charity: SC050365
- Purpose: To deliver and support projects that improve the environmental, social, cultural and economic wellbeing of Inverkething.
- Headquarters: Inverkeithing Civic Centre
- Location: Inverkeithing, Fife, Scotland
- Website: inverkeithingtrust.co.uk

The Inverkeithing Trust is a non profit community group based in Inverkeithing in Fife, Scotland.

== History ==
In 2018, Fife Council commissioned the community survey Imagine Inverkeithing. In response, the Inverkeithing Community Development Group (‘ICDG’) was created. In 2020, this merged into the Inverkeithing Trust.

The Inverkeithing Trust was officially registered on 31 July 2020 as a Scottish Charitable Incorporated Organisation.

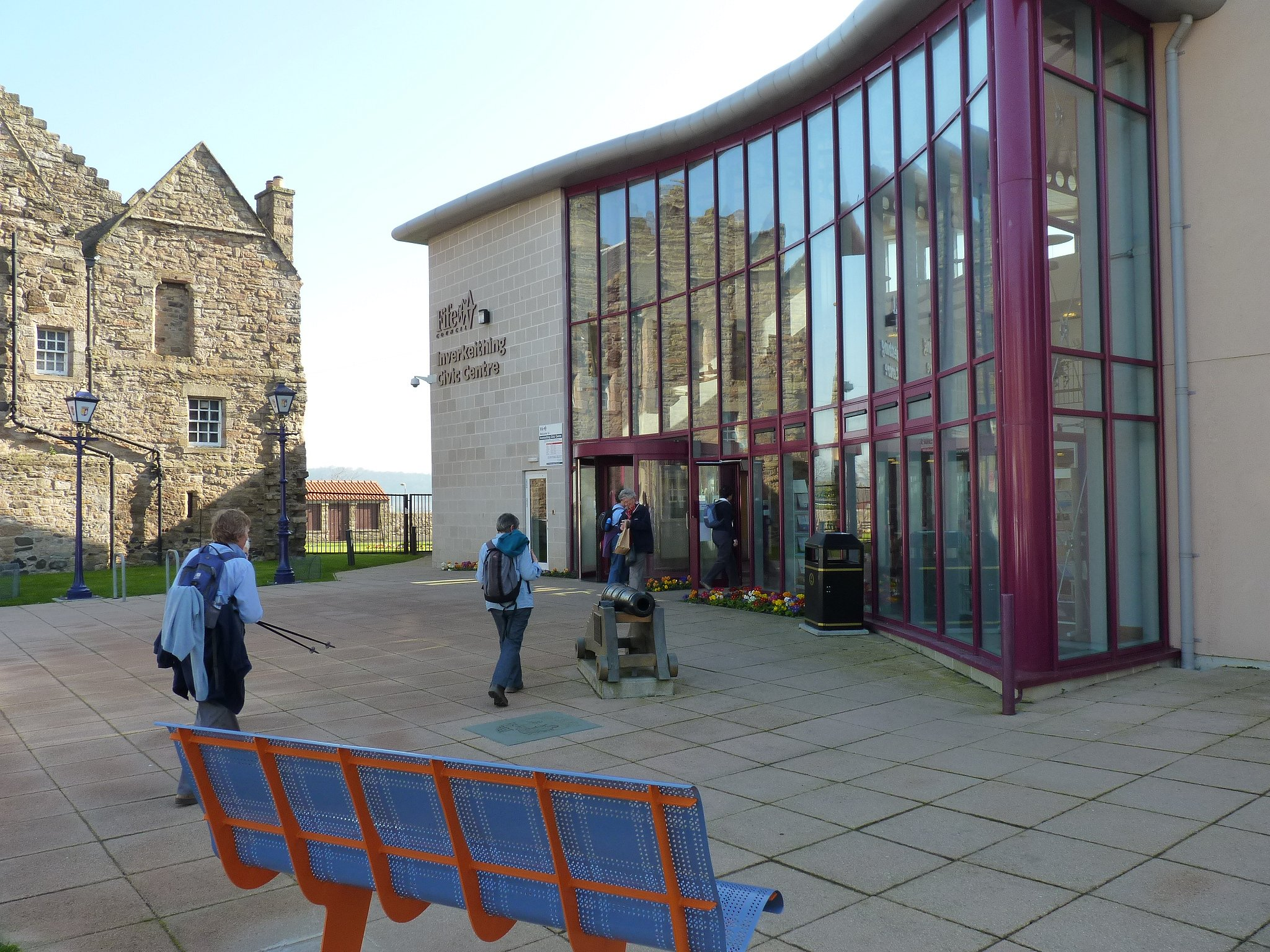
Inverkeithing civic centre, the headquarters of Inverkeithing Trust.

The trust adopted its constitution in July 2020, which set out governance structures and the aim to deliver and support projects that improve the environmental, social, cultural and economic wellbeing of Inverkeithing. The constitution gave Inverkeithing Trust the power to establish, develop and manage community facilities.

== Projects ==
Some of the projects currently done by Inverkeithing Trust include:

- Jointly running the annual Inverkeithing Lammas fair.
- Food for Thought community shop and café at Ballast Bank community centre.
- Annual flower show and garden competition.
- Rewilding and developing community sites like the Friary Gardens play park.
