= Kenneth Roy =

Scottish journalist, writer, and broadcaster

Kenneth Roy (26 March 1945 – 5 November 2018) was a Scottish journalist, writer and broadcaster.

Roy was born in Falkirk. His father, an engineer, and mother, an office worker, were involved in amateur theatre there. He attended Denny High School and, at the age of 13, began contributing to the Falkirk Mail as its Bonnybridge correspondent.

He worked for a short time with the Greenock evening paper before, at the age of 19, he joined the Glasgow Herald, which assigned him to cover the criminal courts. After leaving the paper, he worked in public relations. He then moved to Edinburgh, where he published the magazine Scottish Theatre (1969 - 1973).

In the early 1970s, Roy was offered a job on the early evening news programme, Reporting Scotland by Hugh Cochrane, the Head of News and Current Affairs at BBC Scotland. For several years he co-presented the programme with Mary Marquis. While at the BBC, he worked with the Head of Religious Programmes, Ian Mackenzie, on The Yes, No, Don't Know Show, an early experiment in audience participation, which focused on ethical issues.

As a resident of Inverkeithing in Fife, Kenneth Roy was instrumental in reviving the Inverkeithing Highland Games in 1972.

Roy left the BBC in 1979 and established the 'Maybole consortium' which brought West Sound on air in the autumn of 1981 from studios in Ayr. Afterwards, he set up a company, to publish the biographical reference annual, Who's Who in Scotland, and returned to BBC Scotland as presenter of the weekly politics programme, Agenda. When Scotland on Sunday was launched in 1988 he became the paper's television critic and sketch writer. He then moved to The Observer, where he contributed a series of observational pieces entitled 'Kenneth Roy's Britain'. He also contributed a weekly commentary on current affairs to The Herald, and a daily notebook, 'Kenneth Roy's Pocket Companion', on the back page of The Scotsman.

In 1995, Roy founded The Scottish Review, an independent quarterly of topical essays, biography, contemporary history and travel. The publication migrated to the internet as a weekly in 2008.

In 2000, Roy established the non-political Institute of Contemporary Scotland (ICS) as a social and cultural counterpoint to the recently re-established Scottish Parliament.

Towards the end of his career he wrote two personal accounts of post-war Scotland, The Invisible Spirit (2013), which dealt with the period 1945 to 1975, and The Broken Journey (2016), which continued the story to 1999.
