= Inverkeithing Community Council =

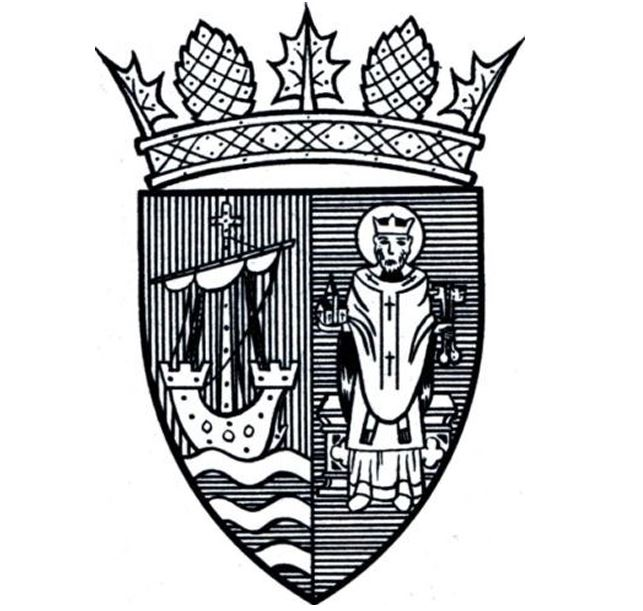
- The Burgh Arms of Inverkeithing.

Type
- Term limits: 4 year terms, no term limit

History
- Founded: Local Government (Scotland) Act 1973; effective 1976

Leadership
- Helen Doig (2026)

Elections
- Next election: On or before 28 September 2027

Meeting place
- Inverkeithing Town House

Inverkeithing Community Council is a community council for Inverkeithing in Fife, Scotland.

== History ==
Inverkeithing was a Royal Burgh with an independent council (Inverkeithing Town Council) from around 1160 AD. The Local Government (Scotland) Act 1973 disbanded Royal Burghs and created community councils. This became effective in 1976.

Inverkeithing Community Council adopted the Burgh Arms of Inverkeithing as their crest on September 18, 1981.

Inverkeithing Community Council sit in Inverkeithing Town House. During a renovation project beginning in 2022, the community council has moved out and temporarily sit in Inverkeithing Civic Centre.

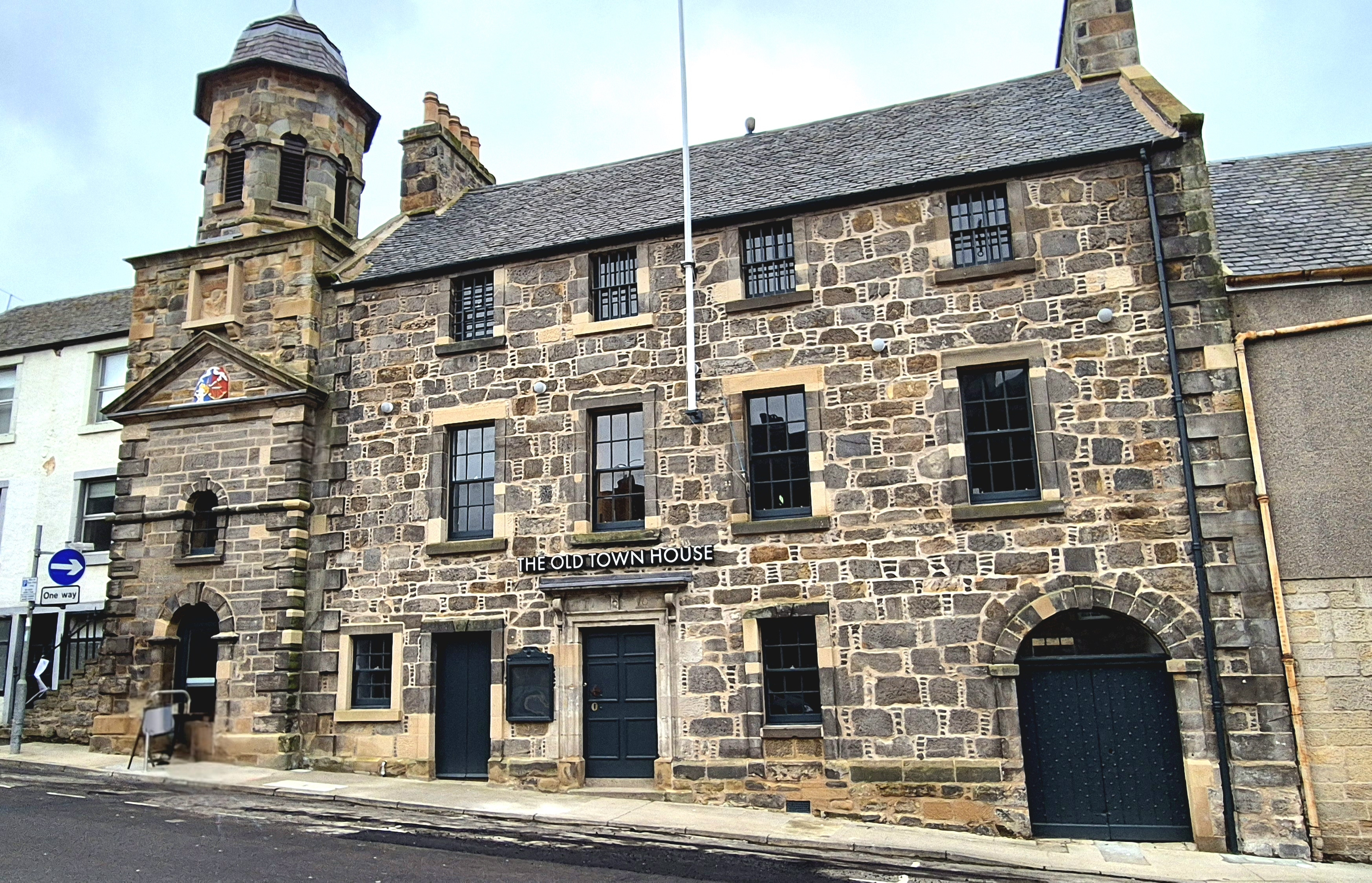
Inverkeithing town house, the seat of Inverkeithing Community Council.

== Present Day ==
Inverkeithing Community Council campaigns on local issues, conducts community surveys, publishes a monthly newsletter and discuss planning and licensing applications. They also organise local events such as an annual Christmas market and Inverkeithing Lammas Fair.

Inverkeithing Community Council is currently chaired by Helen Doig (2026).

Inverkeithing Community Council area has 5,034 constituents (2021).

The last election for Inverkeithing Community Council took place on 28 September 2023. The councillors are elected for 4 year terms, so the next elections are due on or before 28 September 2027.
