= Inverkeithing Town Council =

Inverkeithing Town Council was the local government of Inverkeithing in Fife, Scotland. The council existed in various forms from before 1159 until 1975.

== History ==
=== Medieval era ===
Inverkeithing was a Royal burgh before 1159. The earliest known address to burgesses of the town council was under William the Lion between 1165 and 1214, who empowered the burgh to draw tolls and customs over a large swathe of south Fife.

Inverkeithing ceremonial Provost chain, produced in 1911 in 9ct gold for £55-10s-6d.

Up to at least the mid 14th century, the chief magistrate of the Burgh was designated Alderman. From 1359 to the 16th century, only bailies are mentioned. From the 16th century onwards, the position of Provost emerges.

An Act of Parliament in 1469 changed the voting system and formalised the composition of Inverkeithing town council. The system before 1469 had been a popular vote by the burgesses of the town. According to the Act, this had given rise "to great contention yeirly for the chusing of the samine throw multitude and clamour of commounes, simple persones". The Act gave the council the responsibility of electing itself: "the auld Councel of the toun sall chuse the new Councel". The makeup of the council was the Provost, two bailies, the Dean of Guild, the Treasurer, and ten or more inhabitant burgesses. There were no set term limits to holding office.

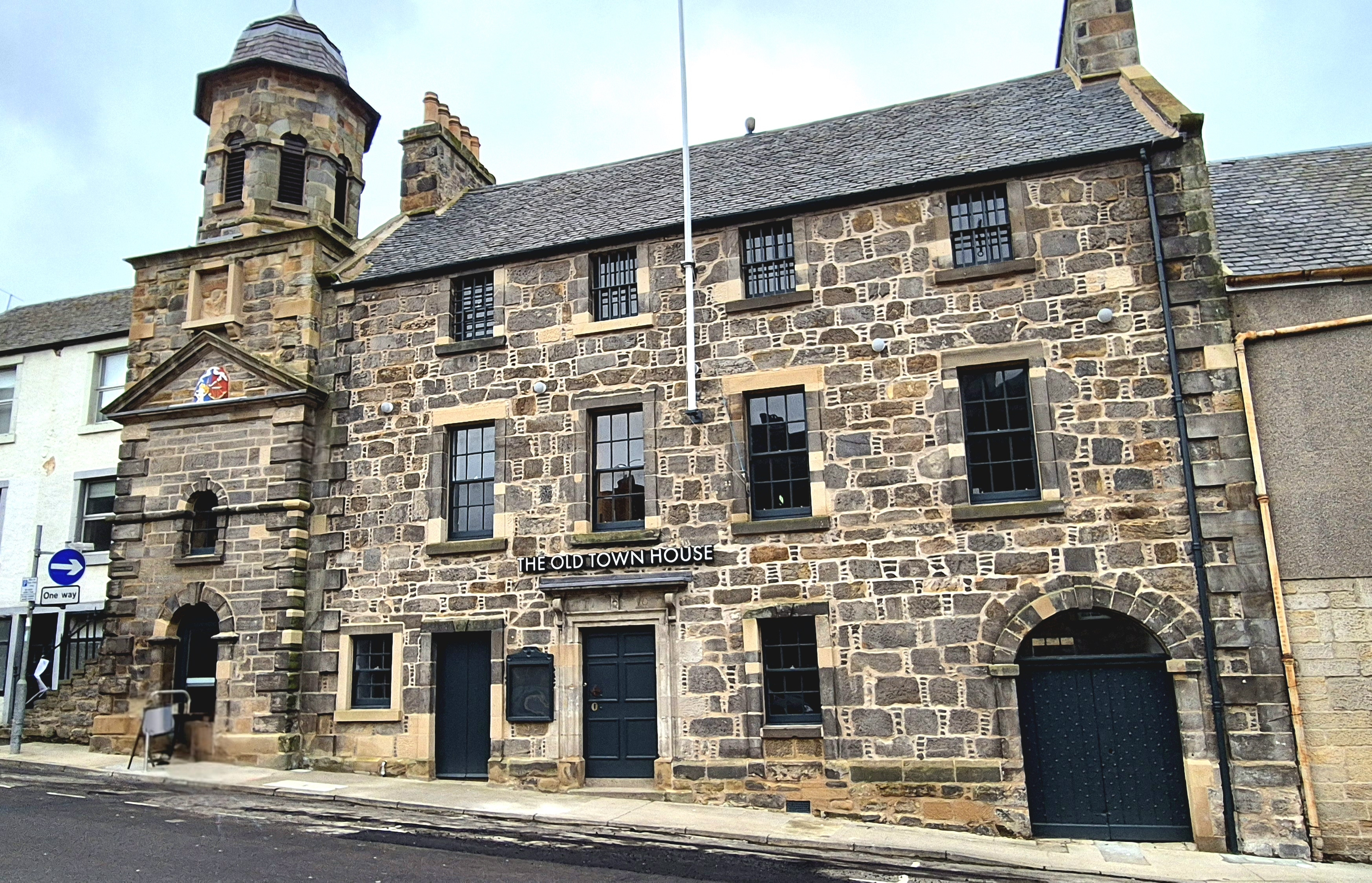
Inverkeithing Town House, the seat of Inverkeithing Town Council, first built before 1550 and rebuilt in 1755-70.

From at least 1550, the seat of Inverkeithing Town Council was the chambers of Inverkeithing Town House.

In 1565-6, Mary Queen of Scots gave James Henderson of Fordell hereditary provostship of Inverkeithing. On October 7, 1566 he was admitted to the office by the Town Council, but on May 28, 1569 the Town Council annulled this appointment on the grounds the 1469 Act of Parliament gave them the ability to choose their provost.

=== 17th and 18th centuries ===
From 1629 to 1680, Inverkeithing Town Council was without a Provost; records of the Covention of Royal burghs indicate this was in part due to the difficulty of finding a person with the requisite formal qualifications.

In 1687, James II appointed magistrates for Inverkeithing Town Council, and instructed them to be elected. They sat for 2 years until the Glorious Revolution in 1689.

On 20 October 1706, Inverkeithing town council voted unanimously to petition Parliament against the proposed Treaty of Union.

In 1708 Inverkeithing became part of the Stirling Burghs constituency along with Dunfermline, Culross, Queensferry and Stirling in the Parliament of the United Kingdom. For parliamentary elections, the town council of each burgh would appoint a representative to a meeting of five who elected the Member of Parliament. This setup changed the nature of Inverkeithing Town Council - political parties now had an incentive to gain a majority on the town council, in order to have representatives loyal to them selected. The result was often bribery, intimidation and disputed elections, such as the 1760 Inverkeithing Provostship election and the 1796 Stirling Burghs election.

In 1716, on petition of the town council, term limits of 2 years were set on the office of Magistrate, Dean of Guild and treasurer.

In 1742, the Deacons of each of the five crafts - Hammermen, Weavers, Bakers, Tailors and Shoemakers - were admitted as councillors.

=== 19th and 20th centuries ===
Until the early 19th century, education in Inverkeithing was administered by the town council;. The schoolmaster would appear at each election of magistrates and lay down the keys to the school door, as a token of servitude to the council.

An 1833 Act of Parliament abolished the old method of election and franchise was extended to most male residents in the burgh.

In 1853, the number of council members was fixed at 12: a Provost, two bailies, and nine councillors who included the Dean of Guild and the Treasurer.

The Local Government (Scotland) Act 1973 abolished Royal burghs and their town councils, and Inverkeithing Council ceased in May 1975. The successor as the local authority became Fife Council, and within the town Inverkeithing Community Council was established as a community council.

== Notable role holders ==
The following is a list of various role holders of Provost and Town Clerk for Inverkeithing Town Council, as compiled by W. Steven (1938).

=== Provost ===
- James Hamilton, Duke of Châtellerault (?-1546).
- William Henderson of Fordell (23 March 1547 - 10 September 1547). His short tenure was due to his death at the Battle of Pinkie.
- James Henderson of Fordell (hereditary provostship granted in 1563; fortified by Sign Manual of Mary Queen of Scots in 1566; anulled in 1569).
- Francis Holburne (1760-?)
- J. Armet (1975), notable as the first female Provost and also the last Provost.

Inverkeithing Provost Medallion, presented by Inverkeithing Town Council to James Fraser, Provost 1949-52 and 1955-58.

=== Town Clerk ===
- James Chalmers (?-c. 1585)
- George Durie (1585 - 1636)
- John Anderson (1637-1649)
- Robert Cant (1649 - 1681)
- James and Robert Cant (28 March 1681 - 19 May 1681)
- Robert Cant (1681 - 1686)
- John Cant (1686 - ?)
- John Cant, son of former Provost (1713 - 1737)
- William Main (1737 - 1742)
- John Cant, reappointed (1742 - 1744)
- William Walker (1744 - 1791)
- James Gillespie (1791 - 1796)
- David Black (1796 - 1822)
- William Barclay (1822 - 1834)
- George Miller (1834 - 1837)
- William Fraser (1838 - 1877)
- Hall Grigor (1877 - 1892)
- John Robert Menzies (1892-?)
