= Inverkeithing town walls =

Defensive structures around Inverkeithing, Scotland

- Inverkeithing, Fife
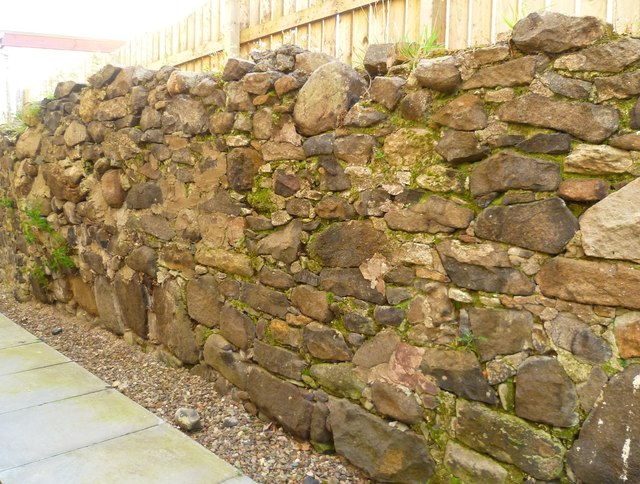
- Surviving section of Inverkeithing town walls, Roman Road.

Site information
- Type: Town wall

Site history
- Built: 1557
- Demolished: after 1773

Listed Building – Category C(S)
- Official name: Roman Road, Town Wall
- Designated: 3 August 2004
- Reference no.: LB49954

Inverkeithing town walls was a set of defensive walls built after 1557 around Inverkeithing in Fife, Scotland.

Taken down by Inverkeithing Town Council in 1773 following long lasting peace and union with England, the surviving section of the walls is now category C listed by Historic Environment Scotland.

== History ==
During the medieval era, Inverkeithing's strategic position at the narrowest crossing point of the Firth of Forth gave it importance militarily and with trade. The town's defences were simple ditches, wooden palisade and wooden ports.

In 1503, an Act of Parliament under James I charged the inhabitants of Inverkeithing with the building of "a wall seaward with ports of stone and lime". There were four gates, known as the "ports"; the east port now marked by a pillar on King Street, the north port, the west port on Hill Street and the south port on Hope Street.

Inverkeithing as shown in detail from Pont's map of c.1590, showing what appears to be a wall on the eastern and northern sides.

In 1557, the town was charged to build stone walls around Inverkeithing, "to big dikes and fowseis and to have stafe slungis in the reddiness to the portio thereof". These were to be further fortified with dykes, ditches and catapults.

Walled towns were rare in Scotland: only Perth, Stirling and Edinburgh were ever genuine walled towns.

In 1773, following a long lasting peace with England and the union, Inverkeithing Town Council ordered the ports of Inverkeithing town walls to be taken down.

Building began outside of the boundaries of the ports in the late 18th and early 19th century.

== Remaining wall and port ==
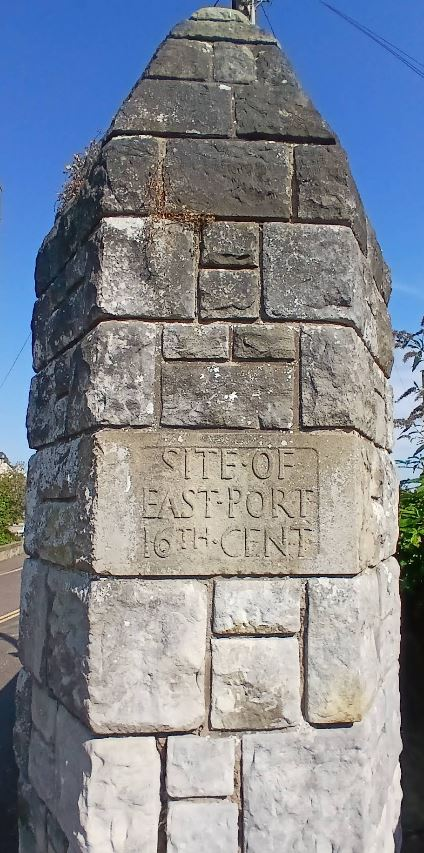
East port of Inverkeithing town walls stone, King Street.

A remaining section of Inverkeithing town walls exists on Roman road, dating from around 1557. It dates to the late 16th century and is 35 metres long. It features a carved marriage lintel from 1618 with the initials of William Blackburn and Janet Bairdie.

The remaining section of Inverkeithing town wall was granted category C listed status by Historic Scotland in August 2004 and has listing number LB49954.

The East port of Inverkeithing town wall stood on King Street; a marker stone remains.
