= Ballast Bank Park =

Park in Inverkeithing, Fife, Scotland

- Ballast bank park aerial photograph (2024).
- Interactive map of Ballast Bank Park
- Type: Parkland
- Location: Inverkeithing, Fife, Scotland
- Coordinates: 56.028°N 3.392°W
- Operator: Fife Council
- Status: Open all year

Ballast Bank Park is a public park in the town of Inverkeithing in Fife, Scotland.

Located on the banks of Inverkeithing Bay on the Firth of Forth, the park is host to the annual Inverkeithing Highland Games, as well as other community events and sports teams.

== History ==
The park takes its name from deposits of ballast stones from ships entering Inverkeithing Bay in the 18th and 19th centuries, which gradually built up and became known as the ballast bank.

Houses were built around the park by Sir Robert Preston in the 1820s, and Commercial Road Bridge - linking the park to Inverkeithing town over the Keithing Burn - was built in 1821.

The park has been the home ground of football clubs. Between 1973 and 1989, Ballast Bank was the home ground of Jubilee Athletic F.C.. The park was the host of Inverkeithing Hillfield Swifts F.C. between 2000 and 2021, and the club still uses the park for training.

== Community events ==
Since 1971, Ballast Bank Park has been host to the Inverkeithing Highland Games, an event dating back to 1646. As of 2025, Inverkeithing's music festival, Divit Fest, is held at Ballast Bank park in August. An annual community firework display is held at the park on 5 November each year.

== Features ==
The park features a standard 400m athletic track. Ballast Bank Park has an outdoor skatepark and playpark, installed in 2016 at the cost of £74,000.

The park features a car park and the Ballast Bank Community Centre.

The park has walking trails with views of the water and across to the Forth Bridges. The park features as part of the trail of the Fife Coastal Path.

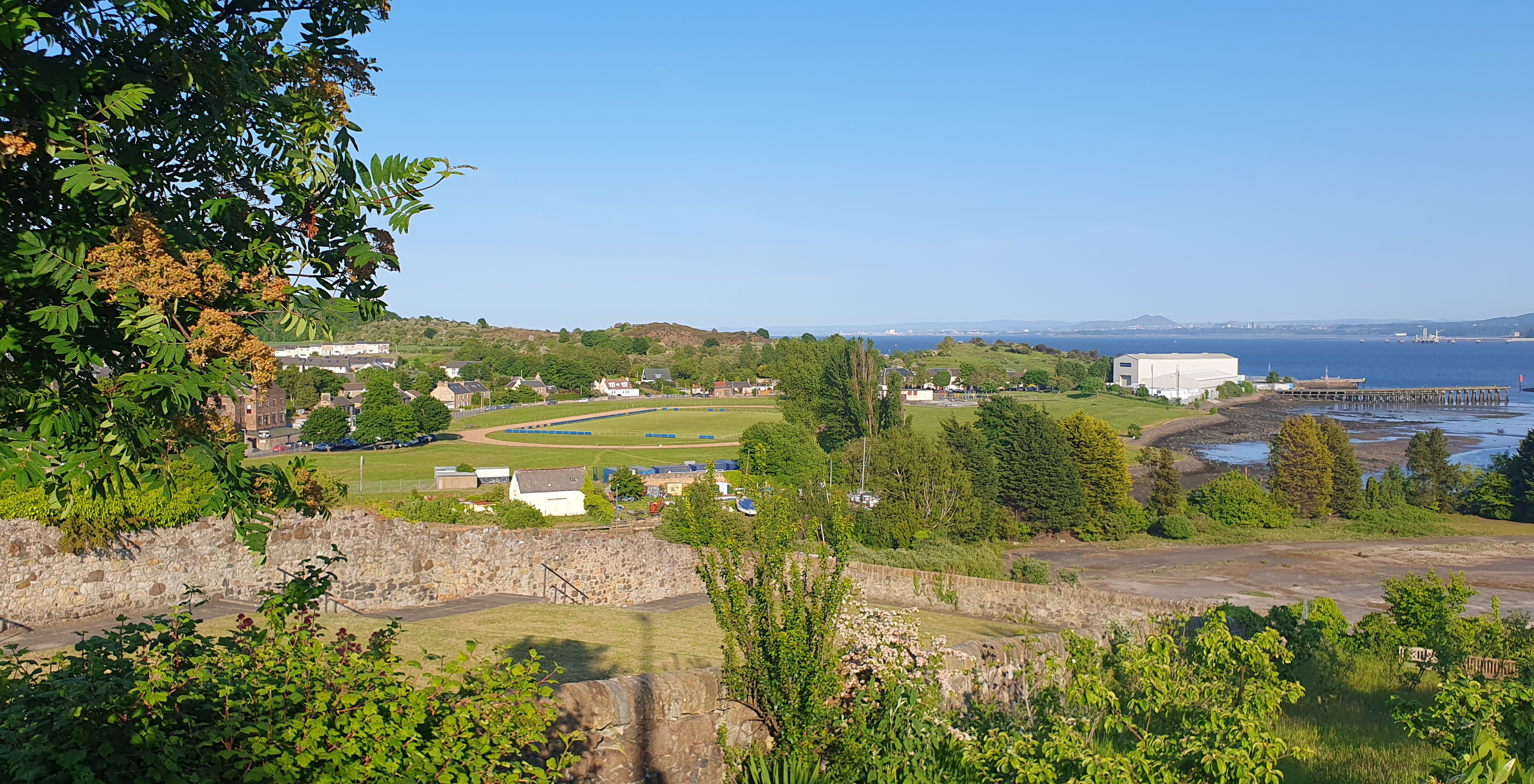
View of Ballast bank park from Inverkeithing Friary gardens.

Section of Ballast Bank park playground.

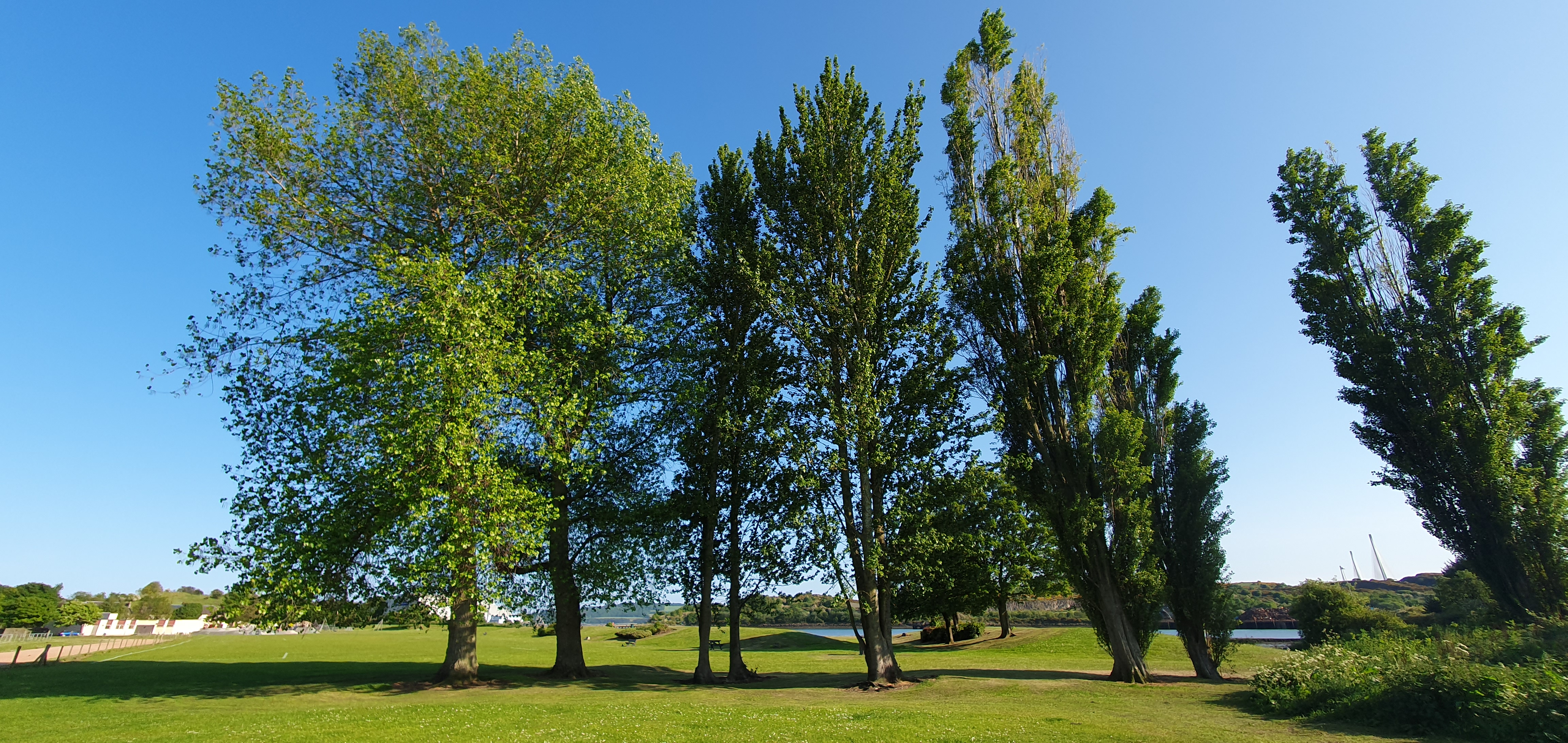
Trees at Ballast Bank park, 2025
