= Inverkeithing Corn Exchange =

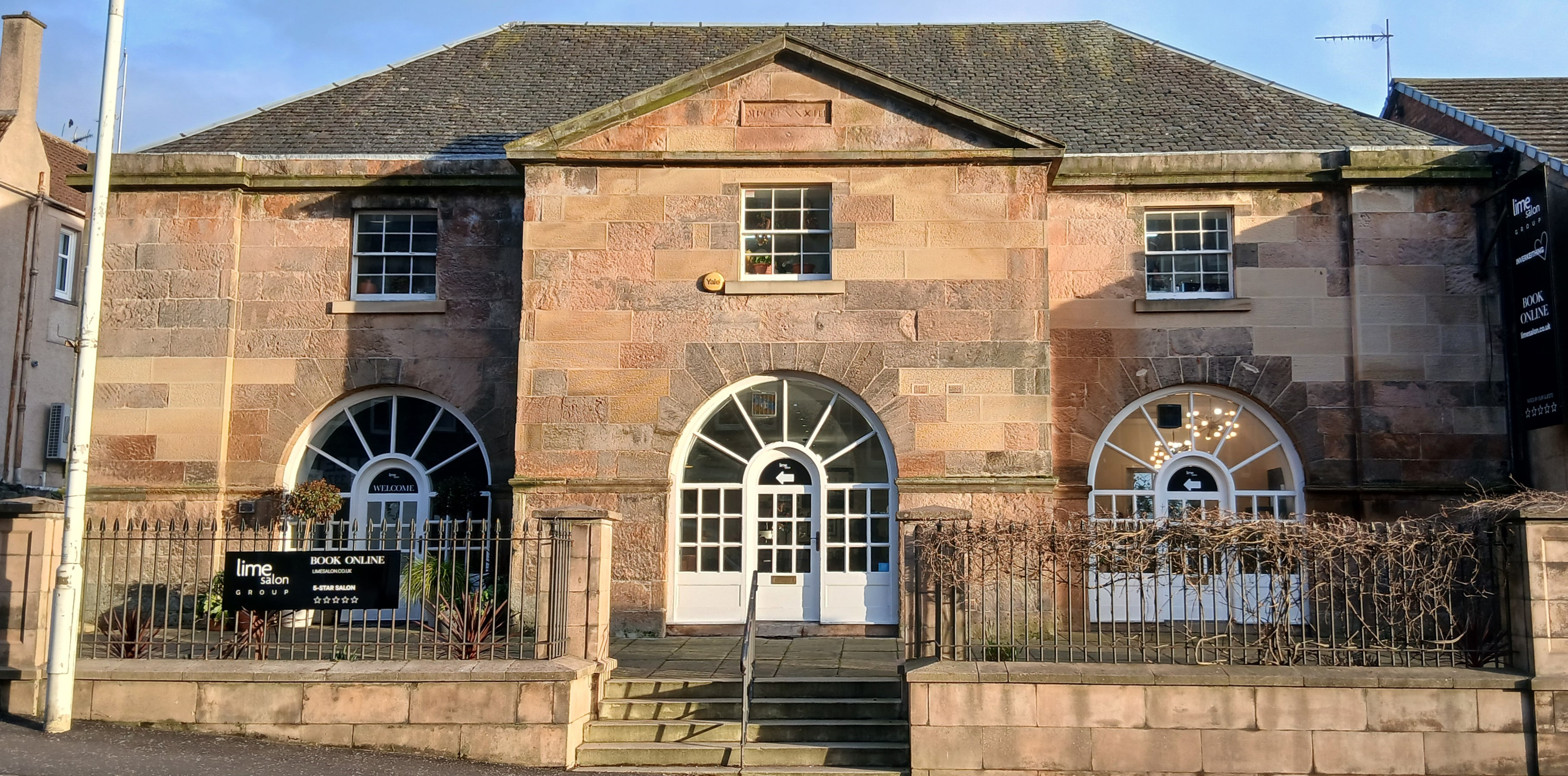
- Inverkeithing Corn Exchange

- Shown in Fife
- 56.02929°N 3.39938°W
- Location: 2 Hope Street, Inverkeithing

History
- Built: 1833

Listed Building – Category B
- Official name: 2 Hope Street, (Old Corn Exchange) Including Terrace
- Designated: 19 December 1979
- Reference no.: LB35110

Inverkeithing Corn Exchange is a neoclassical former corn exchange built in 1833 in the town of Inverkeithing in Fife, Scotland.

== History ==
Inverkeithing Corn Exchange sits approximately on the site of a medieval chapel granted to Dunfermline Abbey by Malcom IV, recorded in 1159.

In the early 19th century, agricultural improvements, such as enclosure (making it easier to drain and irrigate land and experiment with new crops), efforts to reclaim mossy lands and new technology and practices had meant Inverkeithing parish had an abundant supply of wheat, barley, oats, beans, peas, potatoes, hay and turnips.

Inverkeithing Corn Exchange was built in 1833 to serve Inverkeithing's bustling market trade, growing population and rising prosperity, as a place to auction agricultural goods.

Inverkeithing Corn Exchange is listed in the 1856 Ordnance Survey map as 'Market House'. In January 1912, the Council decided the building be used for drill purposes, and by 1913 the building was referred to as "drill hall". The Navy mission closed operations in the building on 30th September 1917. Later in the 20th century it was used by William Black's motor traders. By 2003, the building was a chemist's laboratory. Currently, the building houses Lime Salon Group (2026).

== Architecture ==
The building is of symmetrical neoclassical style, is built of sandstone and features glazed round door archways. The architectural style mirrors contemporary nearby developments in Edinburgh's Georgian New Town.

The central bay of the building is set forward, and inscribed into stone pediment above is the year of construction "MDCCCXXXIII" in Roman numerals (1833).

== Listed status ==
Inverkeithing Corn Exchange was awarded Category B listed status by Historic Scotland in December 1979. In their statement of special interest, Historic Scotland note: "The austere classical detailing befits the standing of the Old Corn Exchange, formerly an important public building serving Inverkeithing's once bustling market trade" and that "...the distinguished character of the building has been retained".
