= Inverkeithing Highland Games =

Highland games event in Fife, Scotland

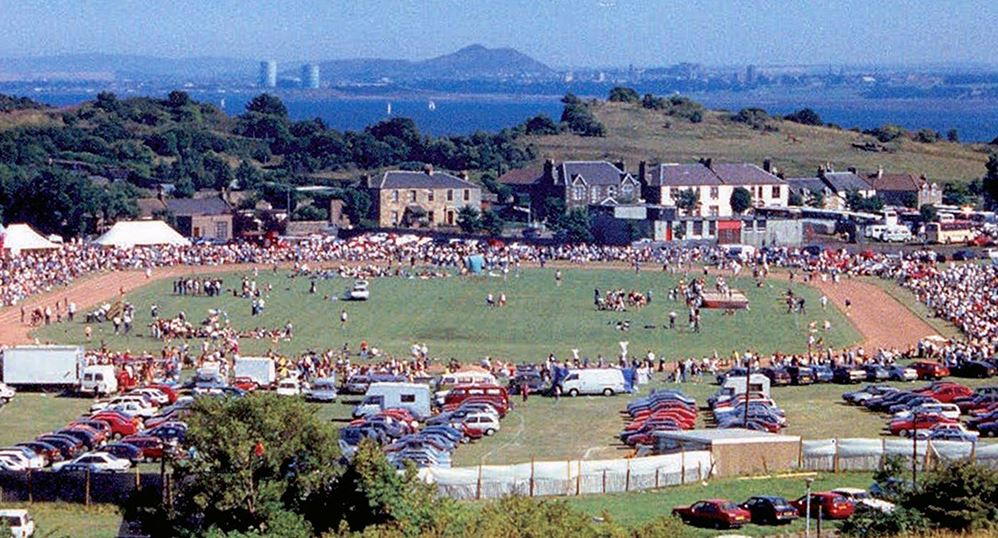
- Inverkeithing Highland Games, 1986.
- Genre: Highland Games
- Date: First Weekend in August
- Locations: Inverkeithing, Fife
- Country: Scotland, United Kingdom
- Inaugurated: Before 1646
- Chairman: Malcolm McGregor
- Website: inverkeithinghighlandgames.com

The Inverkeithing Highland Games is a highland games event in Inverkeithing, Fife, Scotland. The games have been held in the town since 1646, and are currently held at Ballast Bank Park.

== History ==
The present highland format of the games is first recorded in 1646. The games in Inverkeithing run in conjunction with the town's annual Lammas fair, which was described in Burgh records of 1648 as “… a great day for fun, frolic, fit races, ale and drunken folks, gentle and simple”.

The games were held at Kirkgate Park, Belleknowes until 1967. In 1971, the games were re-opened at their current home at Ballast Bank Park, Inverkeithing, where they have been held ever since. The re-opening was largely due to Kenneth Roy of BBC Scotland, resident and local historian of Inverkeithing.

The 2025 Inverkeithing Highland Games saw record-breaking attendance, estimated at over 5,000 people.

The Chieftain of Inverkeithing Highland Games is the honorary leader or patron who officially opens the event, leads the massed pipe bands, and acts as a figurehead for the day. The title has existed since the first Chieftain, ex-provost James Fraser, in 1972. The current Chieftain, since 2025, is David Baratt MSP.

== Events ==
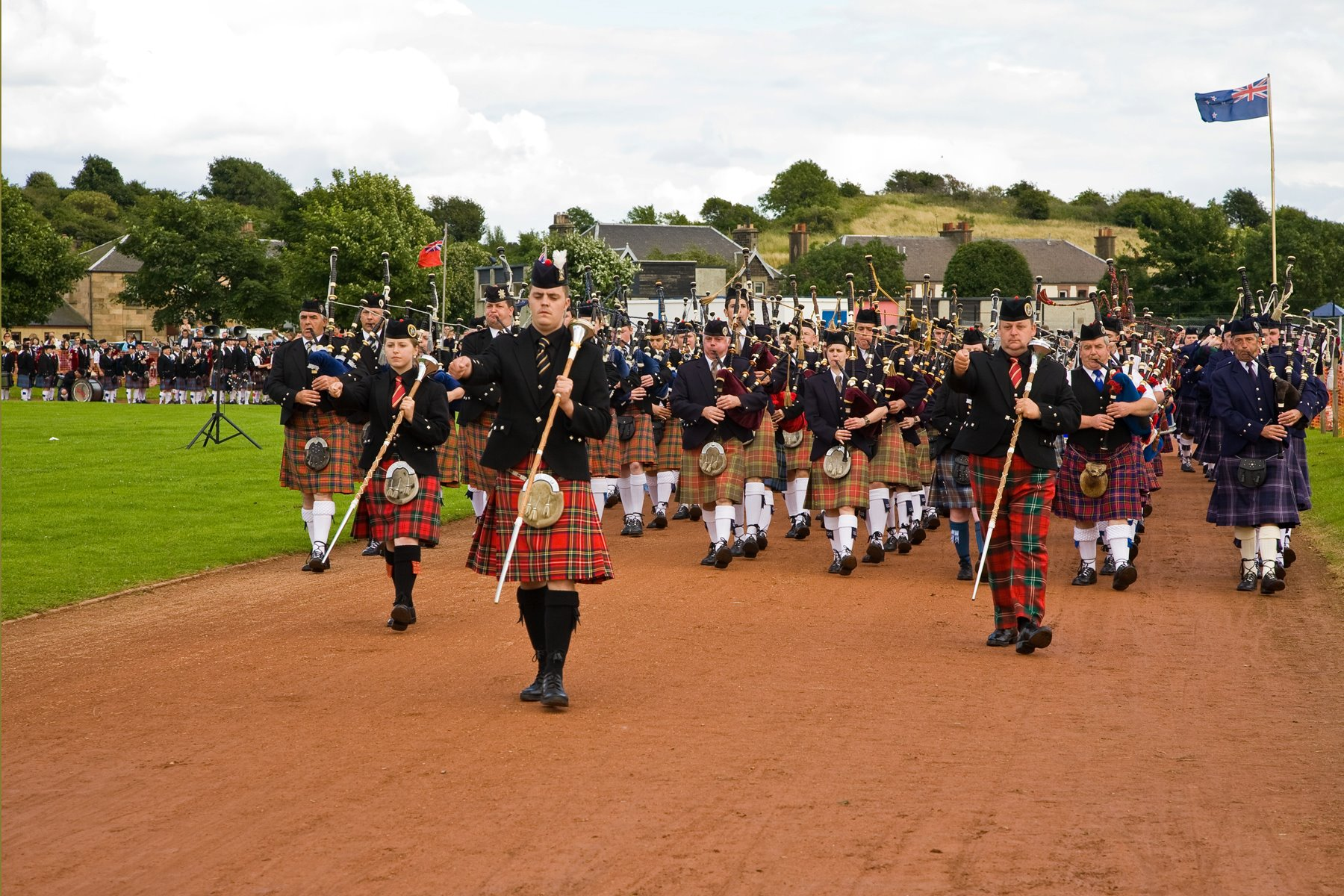
Opening ceremony pipe band for Inverkeithing Highland Games, 2018.

The games are opened by a pipe band marching through Inverkeithing town towards Ballast Bank Park. There is a solo piping event.

Highland dancing is a feature of the highland games. In 2025, over 100 dancers were accommodated, from Scotland, the US, Canada, Australia, New Zealand and across the Commonwealth.

The games traditionally feature running and cycling events and heavyweight events including caber toss, shot put and hammer throw. The games also feature weight for distance and weight over the bar events for men and women.

In 2026, there was a divot-throwing contest, inspired by a local legend that Inverkeithing residents threw turf divots at industrialist Andrew Carnegie as he passed through the town, recruiting local men for work in America; the crowd showed they did not want to leave by throwing the divots.

== Film & TV ==
The Inverkeithing Highland games feature in the US television show Duck Dynasty, first aired in 2014. In season 7, episode 1, cast members visit Inverkeithing Highland games and participate in some of the events, including the tug of war.
