= Rebellion of the Three Earls (1363) =

The Rebellion of the Three Earls was a rebellion against David II in Scotland that took place over the spring and summer of 1363.

Ultimately unsuccessful, the failed rebellion strengthened David's authority and forced the three rebel leaders - Robert the Steward (later Robert II), William, Earl of Douglas, and Patrick V, Earl of March - to swear a renewed oath of loyalty to David.

== Background ==
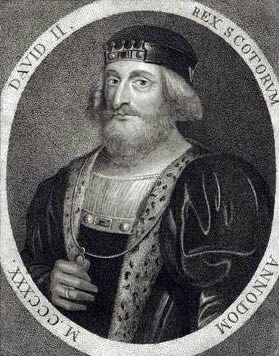
David II of Scotland by Sylvester Harding (1797).

David II had been in English captivity between 1346 and 1357. During David's captivity, Robert the Steward, the king's nephew and heir presumptive, had exercised considerable authority as Guardian of Scotland. Following his return in 1357, David's ransom to England was an expensive burden. David sought to strengthen royal authority by promoting a group of younger nobles and royal servants across Scotland.

Robert the Steward was concerned by David II's planned marriage to Margaret Drummond, which raised the possibility that the king might have children, threatening Robert the Steward's succession.

William, Earl of Douglas, was aggrieved by the king's military promotion of his cousin Archibald Douglas, who he believed to be a potential threat.

Patrick V, Earl of March, was aggrieved at what he regarded as the crown's failure to protect his family's interests.

== The Rebellion ==
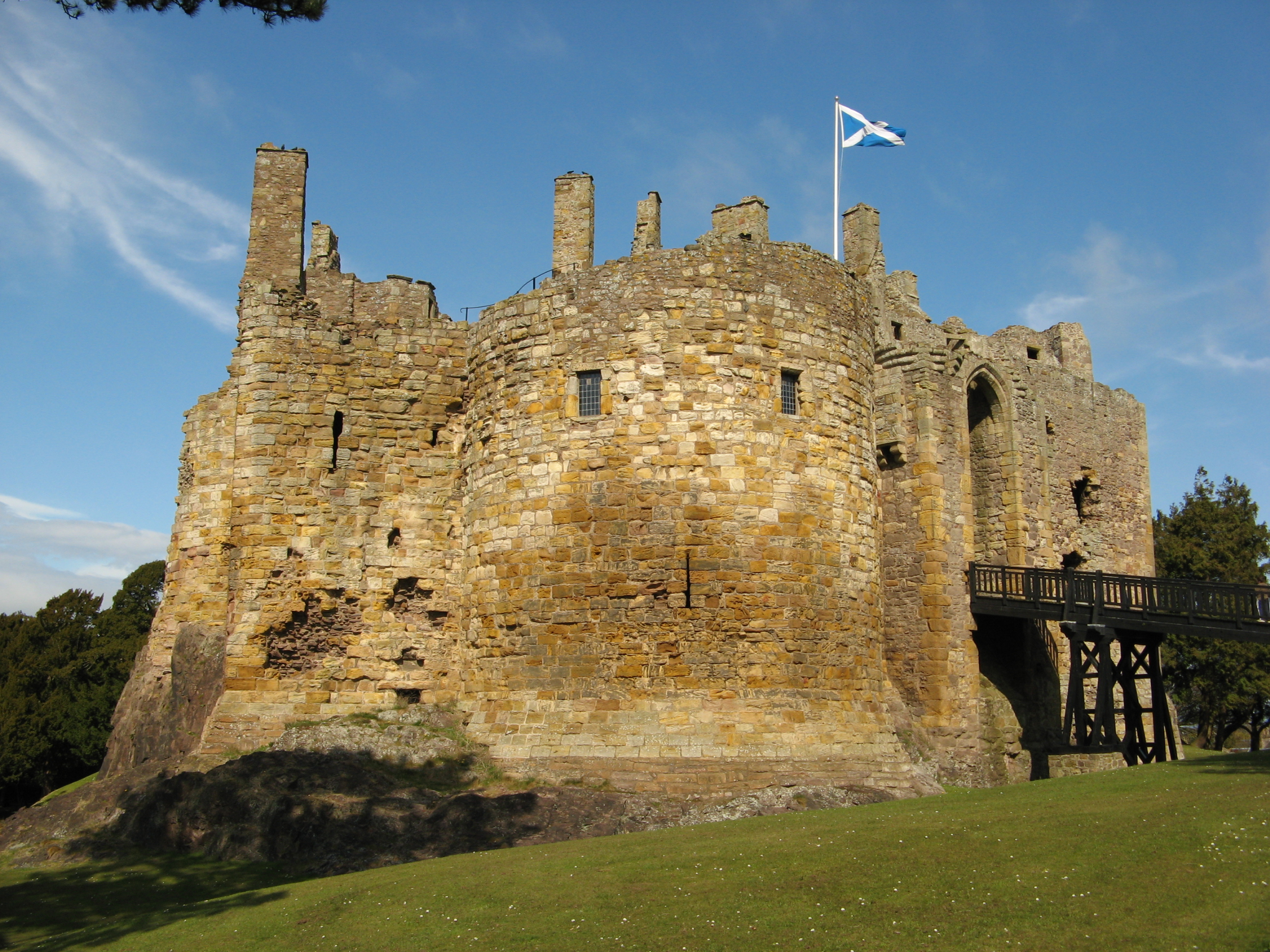
Dirleton Castle, captured in spring 1363 as part of the Rebellion of the Three Earls.

The rebellion began in spring 1363, when William, Earl of Douglas, seized Dirleton Castle from Sir Walter Haliburton, one of David's royal supporters. The rebels subsequently attacked or imprisoned supporters of the king.

The three principal rebel leaders - Robert the Steward, William, Earl of Douglas, and Patrick V, Earl of March - issued a statement presenting their actions as a defence of the wider Scottish community, accusing David of misusing money raised for his ransom, and demanding better government.

David II responded by assembling a royal army. He had to pay over £600 for troops to quell the rebellion, a sign of his weakened authority according to Penman (2004).

During the rebellion, Robert the Steward attacked royal properties at night in Inverkeithing. He "captured the Sherrif of Angus with a company or armed men on their way to join the king, and sent them to prison in various places". They raided and plundered the town.

The rebels' objectives were not entirely unified, which contributed to the rebellion's collapse. Robert the Steward submitted to the king by April 1363. Douglas continued his resistance for longer, but submitted after David marched against him at Lanark, bringing the rebellion to an end.

== Aftermath ==
After ending the rebellion, David did not confiscate the estates of the three earls or exile them. Instead, he required them to swear renewed oaths of loyalty, to ‘my lord and his ministers and whomsoever my lord king wishes to call his faithful men’. The Steward was subjected to particularly stringent conditions, including a promise not to enter into political agreements without the king's permission and a threat to his right of succession should he break the oath.

David II proceeded with his marriage to Margaret Drummond on 20 February 1364. This marriage failed to produce an heir, and Robert the Steward succeeded David II as King of Scotland after his death in 1371.
