= Murder of Henry Stenhouse =

1707 murder in Scotland

- Location: Inverkeithing, Fife, Scotland
- Date: April 9, 1707
- Attack type: Murder

On 9 April 1707, Robert Balfour, 5th Lord Balfour of Burleigh shot Henry Stenhouse in Inverkeithing, Fife, Scotland. Stenhouse died from his wounds 12 days later. The circumstances around the murder - a romantic dispute and Balfour's escape from Edinburgh Tolbooth by switching clothes with his sister - made the murder famous in early 18th century England.

== Background ==
In 1705, Balfour, born to the noble Burleigh family, had fallen in love with Janet Thomson, daughter of Thomas Thomson, shipmaster and burgess of Inverkeithing. She was inferior to him in rank. His family had sent him to travel abroad in the hope that he would forget his attachment. Before leaving Scotland he declared that if she married in his absence, he would kill her husband.

Despite the threat, she married Henry Stenhouse, schoolmaster at Inverkeithing, on 6 December 1705.

== The murder ==
On Balfour's return, his first inquiry was after the woman. On being informed of her marriage, on 9 April 1707 he proceeded on horseback with two attendants directly to the school at Inverkeithing, called Stenhouse out, and shot him, wounding him in the shoulder.

An account of the incident as told by John McLaurin in Remarkable Cases before the High Court of Justiciary (1774) is:

"Mr Henry excused himself: 'it was hard to oblige him to fight a man that he had never injured; and that he had neither horse nor arms, but was in his night-gown, teaching his scholars and it was against his principles to fight duels'. Then Burleigh insisting he fight or be murdered, Mr Henry said 'I'll rather fight' - but he shot him with the same breath. Seeing he did not fall deaad ant once, Burleigh pulled out another pistol saying 'I have missed the dog', but the cry of the people arising, he instantly made his escape and having drawn his sword rode away at the gallop".

Balfour returned to Burleigh; Stenhouse died 12 days later of his wounds.

== Trial ==
After a proclamation was issued with a reward of 200 shillings for apprehending Balfour, he was apprehended. Balfour was tried for the murder in the High Court of Justiciary in Edinburgh on 28 July 1709.

Balfour's defence argued there had been no intent to kill; that the wound was deliberately to the arm to frighten or correct; and that as Stenhouse lived for 12 days after the being shot he had died of a 'fretful temper'.

Balfour was found guilty on August 4 1709, and was sentenced to be beheaded at "the Cross of Edinburgh" on 6 January 10.

== Balfour's escape and aftermath ==
A few days before Balfour's beheading, he escaped captivity in the Edinburgh Tolbooth by exchanging clothes with his sister.

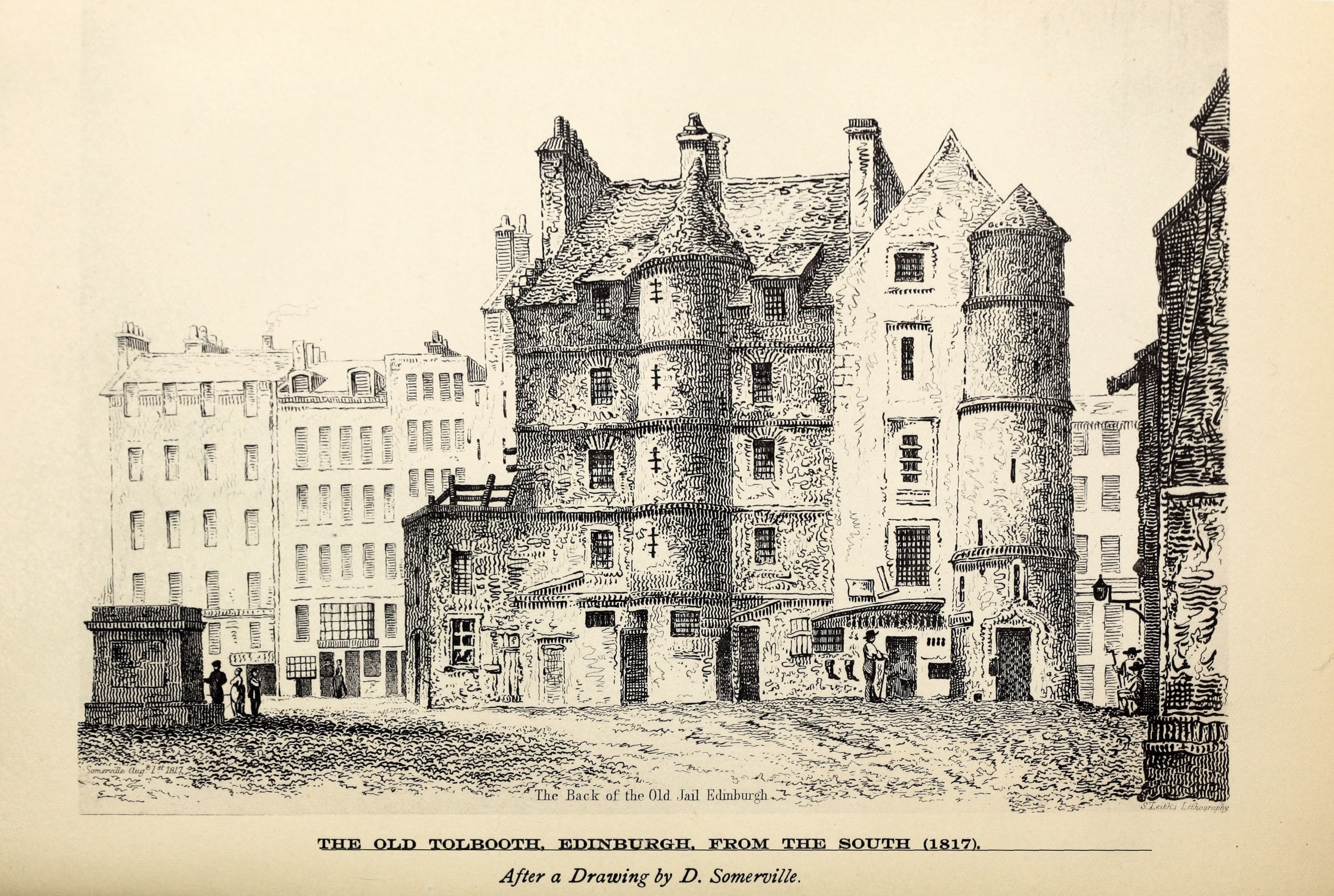
Edinburgh tollbooth

He returned in hiding to Burleigh, and is reputed to have concealed himself in a hollowed ash-tree afterwards named "Burleigh's Hole".

On 2 January 1710, Lord Advocate David Dalrymple wrote to the sheriff of Berwick asking for a search to be made for Balfour; Balfour is described as "of a fine complexion, sharp nosed and a countenance rather long than round, speaks thick and after the Dialect of Fyfe".

The title of Lord of Burleigh was devolved to Balfour in 1713, and he engaged in the Jacobite rebellion of 1715. For this his estates were forfeited to the Crown.

The murder of Henry Stenhouse is retold by writer Daniel Defoe in his 1724 Tour thro' the Whole Island of Great Britain; Defoe asserts that the story had been much talked about in England at the time.

Balfour died in 1757 and was buried at Greyfriars Kirkyard, Edinburgh.
