= Inverkeithing Town House =

Municipal building in Inverkeithing, Scotland

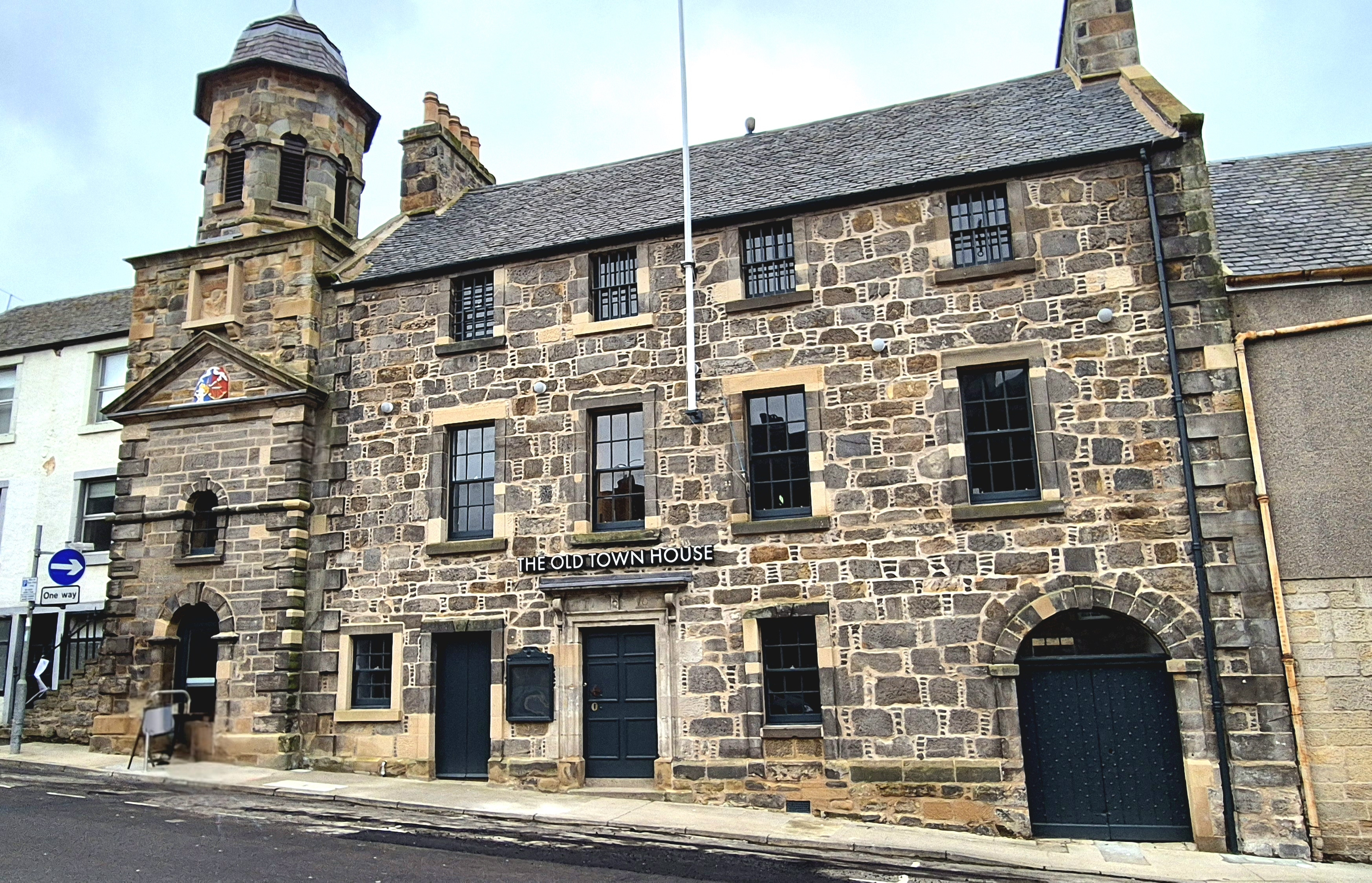
- Inverkeithing Town House

- Shown in Fife
- 56.0313°N 3.3969°W
- Location: Townhall Street, Inverkeithing

History
- Built: Before 1550
- Rebuilt: 1755–1770

Site notes
- Architect(s): John and George Monroe
- Architectural style: Neoclassical style

Listed Building – Category A
- Official name: Townhall Street, Town House
- Designated: 11 December 1972
- Reference no.: LB35087

Inverkeithing Town House is a municipal building in Townhall Street, Inverkeithing in Fife, Scotland.

Originally built before 1550, the surviving building was rebuilt between 1755 and 1770. The town house is an example of renaissance and neoclassical architecture. Formerly a council chambers, prison and courtroom, the building is the seat of Inverkeithing Community Council.

The town house is a Category A listed building by Historic Scotland.

== History ==
=== The original building ===
The first municipal building in the town was a tolbooth which dated back at least to the mid-16th century. It is referred to in 1550, when a rent of 20/- is stated as accruing from the shops or booths in the ground floor.

Six women were accused of witchcraft and incarcerated in Inverkeithing Town House in 1621, part of the Inverkeithing witch hunt.

=== The new town house ===
The new tower was designed by John Monroe in the Renaissance style, built in coursed sandstone and was completed in 1755. However, by December 1769, the main section of the tolbooth was also in a dilapidated state and the burgh leaders decided to demolish this as well and to erect the main section of a new town house on the same site. The main section was designed by George Monroe in the neoclassical style, also built in sandstone and was completed in 1770.

The building continued to serve as the meeting place of the burgh council until the 20th century, and ceased to be the local seat of government when the enlarged Dunfermline District Council was formed in 1975. The town house subsequently became the meeting place of Inverkeithing Community Council.

A major programme of restoration works was initiated with financial support from Fife Council, the National Lottery Heritage Fund, Historic Environment Scotland and the Scottish Government in June 2022.

== Architecture ==
The four-stage tower featured a round headed doorway with pilasters, voussoirs and a keystone in the first stage and a small window with voussoirs and a keystone in the second stage. The second stage was surmounted by a pediment containing the burgh coat of arms in the tympanum.

The design for the main section involved an asymmetrical main frontage with four bays facing onto Townhall Street; the second bay from the left featured a doorway flanked by pilasters supporting a cornice and the fourth bay featured a pend leading to St Peter's churchyard behind. The first floor was fenestrated by four evenly spaced sash windows with architraves and the second floor was fenestrated by four evenly spaced small square windows with wrought iron grills. Internally, the principal rooms were the prison for petty criminals on the ground floor, the courtroom on the first floor and the prison for debtors on the second floor.

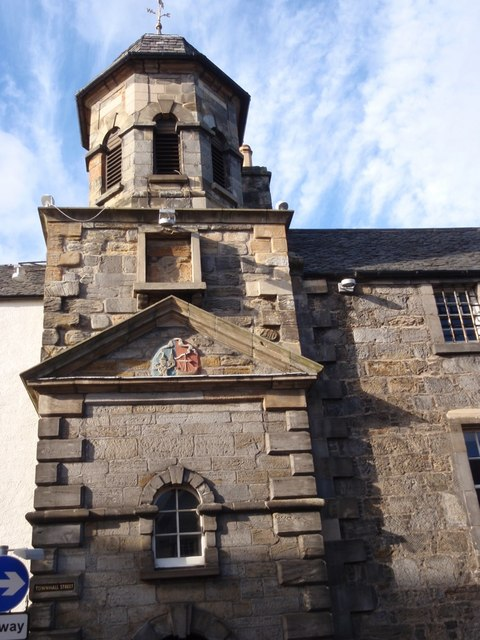
Tollbooth tower of Inverkeithing town house.

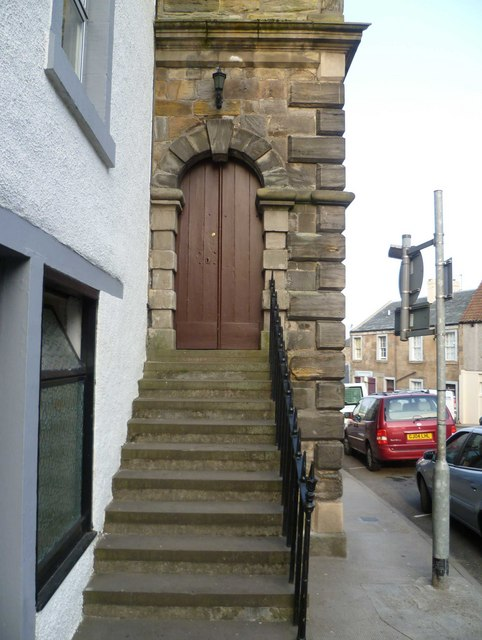
Steps up to Inverkeithing town house, Townhall Street.

== See also ==
- List of listed buildings in Inverkeithing, Fife
- List of Category A listed buildings in Fife
