= Inverkeithing Lammas Fair =

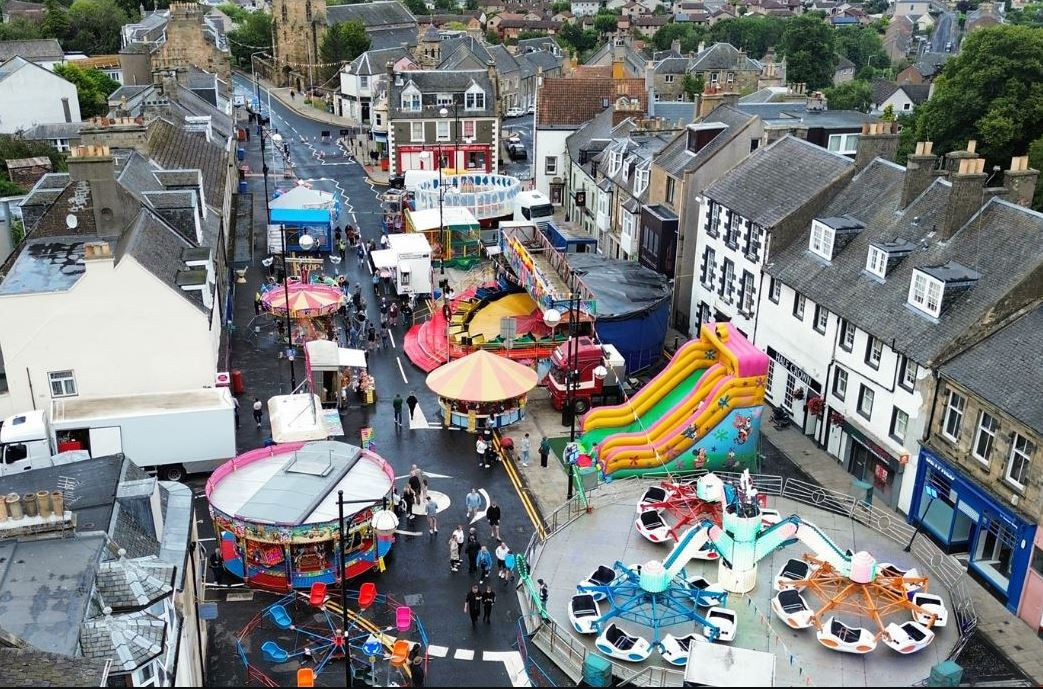
- Inverkeithing Lammas Fair Rides 2025
- Genre: Lammas Fair
- Date: First week in August
- Locations: Inverkeithing, Fife
- Country: Scotland, United Kingdom
- Inaugurated: Before 1503

Inverkeithing Lammas Fair is an annual Lammas fair event held at Inverkeithing in Fife, Scotland. It is among the oldest Lammas fairs, dating from before 1503, and is one of only two remaining in Scotland.

== History ==
The tradition of Lammas fairs in Scotland is rooted in ancient harvest festivals. Inverkeithing Lammas Fair dates from before 1503; the Lammas Fair of 1503 is recorded as being attended by King James IV. James IV attended again in 1508, and royal records show he had a large retinue in tow, including Pyke de la Mair and Pieris, a noted artist.

In 1640, the Lammas fair was moved from the first day in August to the second Wednesday of August.

The earliest written description of Inverkeithing's Lammas Fair Celebrations dates to 1648, and is found in the burgh records. It describes the fair as "...a great day for fun, frolic, fit races, ale and drunken folks, gentle and simple".

The Lammas Fair is held in conjunction with Inverkeithing Highland Games, and has been since at least 1652.

In a minute from the town council dated April 1753, the lammas fair is described as: "for all kinds of linen and woolen goods... for horses and cattle, and all kinds of merchant goods".

Inverkeithing Lammas Fair is one of only two still taking place in Scotland - the other is St Andrews Lammas Fair.

Rides were added to the Lammas fair in the 20th century.

Inverkeithing Lammas Fair c. 1900.

Inverkeithing Lammas fair rides, mid 20th century.

=== Hat and Ribbon Race ===
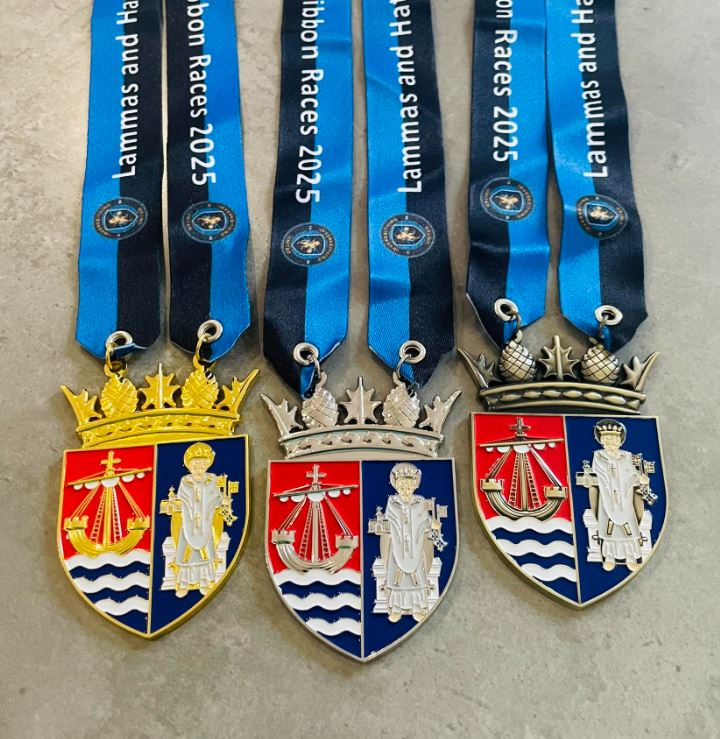
Inverkeithing Lammas Fair medals for Hat and Ribbon Race, 2025.

The Inverkeithing Lammas Fair Hat and Ribbon Race is believed to be the oldest road race in Scotland. It was originally a race of seven furlongs for shepherds whose flocks used the local fields for grazing on their way to the Edinburgh markets. The name of the race originates from the prize of ribbons to gift their sweethearts, and a hat for themselves.

The following excerpt is from a poem from the 15th January 1887 edition of the Dunfermline Press describes the Hat and Ribbon race:

The bannit's his - the ribbons, Tam's

The race as stiff an' keen:

Noo, a' are makin' for the Toon,

An' scattered owre the green,

A rousin' supper winds up a',

Wi' beefstack pie, an' yill

I fear there'll be sair heids the morn,

Whan they hae their full

Today, hats and ribbons are still paraded through the town as part of the Lammas Fair alongside a pipe band (2026).

=== Lammas Queen ===
The Lammas Queen tradition involves a local girl chosen to preside over the Lammas fair.

Crowning of the Inverkeithing Lammas Queen, c. 1912.

Miss Effie Hamilton, Lammas Fair Queen 1909.
