= Three Lions Pride =

LGBTQ supporters' group for the England national football team

- The logo and flag of Three Lions Pride, featuring the FA's coat of arms modified by David Gwinnutt.
- Established: 2016; 10 years ago
- Founder: Di Cunningham, Joe White
- Parent organization: England national football team

Three Lions Pride (3LP) is the LGBTQ supporters' group for the England national football team which is backed by the Football Association (FA). Founded by Di Cunningham and Joe White, many of its members are also part of LGBTQ supporters' groups for English football clubs, including Arsenal's Gay Gooners, Norwich City's Proud Canaries, and Tottenham Hotspur's Proud Lilywhites. The group attends international games, having displayed their banner at the 2018 FIFA World Cup in Russia and attended the UEFA Euro 2024 in Germany, though have not attended the Qatar World Cup in 2022 due to safety issues, and have also stated they will not attend the event in North America in 2026.

== History ==
=== 2016–18: Formation and Russia World Cup attendance ===
Three Lions Pride was set up around 2016, during the build-up to the 2018 FIFA World Cup in Russia. It was co-founded by chair of Pride in Football (PiF) and Proud Canaries founder Di Cunningham, and Gay Gooners member Joe White.

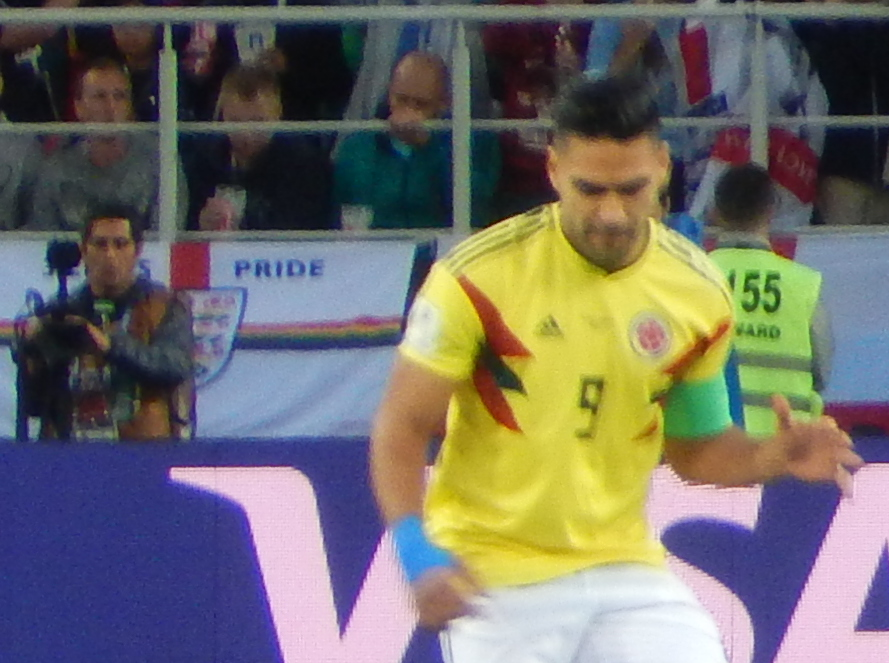
The Three Lions Pride flag was visible at the 2018 FIFA World Cup match in Russia, between Colombia and England

In June 2018, the Football Association (FA) which holds the rights to the three lions insignia denoting the England national team, approved 3LP's use of a rainbow version of the insignia newly designed by David Gwinnutt. On 18 June, a small group of 3LP members including Cunningham unveiled the 3LP branded rainbow banner at England’s first game in that year's World Cup which was against Tunisia in Volgograd, Russia. They also wore scarves with the same design at the game alongside the London Titans, an LGBTQ football club based in London. The Foreign, Commonwealth and Development Office had previously directed England fans to guidance published by the Football Supporters' Federation which had encouraged supporters to "not publicly display your sexuality." This was due to the 2013 Russian anti-LGBTQ law which made the promotion of non-traditional relationships illegal in Russia. Russian officials, however, guaranteed that they would not take action to remove the banner from the stadium. The group received death threats before arriving in Russia. Cunningham was held at the entrance to the stadium but was ultimately let through after the police allowed the banner. She has stated that a Russian fan came up to her before the match to ask if the banner was a gay symbol; she said that "He looked fascinated, you could see him processing it, and thinking this is just totally outside his experience. We set him up with some networking information." 3LP made the banner visible at five England matches during the tournament, meeting local LGBTQ groups in each city. Just prior to one match, the banner was torn down and confiscated by stewards; Cunningham has said that a steward said, "Those colours are not allowed in the stadium". Following calls to the FA, the stewards allowed the banner to stay up before kickoff. The group was additionally subject to occasional homophobic slurs in and around the stadiums. In 2019, Cunningham and White received the Attitude Pride Award for their efforts at the World Cup.

=== 2022–24: Qatar World Cup boycott and attendance of UEFA Euro in Germany ===
In September 2022 in the lead-up to the 2022 FIFA World Cup in Qatar, White said that while he appreciated the FA's efforts, he called for Qatar's authorities to state publicly that gay fans would be completely protected from the country's anti-LGBTQ laws "because ultimately they are the ones who can enforce or suspend laws." He said there were no LGBTQ people joining the England Supporters Travel Club (ESTC) for the World Cup, and said he "highly doubt[ed]" that any gay fans were going to Qatar to support England. At a Sport & Rights Alliance press briefing in November that year, Cunningham said that 3LP did not attend the 2022 World Cup, and said 3LP's decision to attend the event in Russia four years prior was different as in Qatar there was "no sign – as there was in Russia – of any appetite to relax or review the toxic environment there is for LGBTQ+ and other minority groups". She went on to criticise David Beckham on behalf of 3LP for his decision to become a paid ambassador for that year's World Cup, noting that LGBTQ fans had "put David Beckham on a pedestal, as a great ally", and calling his decision "incredibly disappointing."

The UEFA Euro 2024 in Germany was the first occasion in which 3LP members intended to travel abroad in significant numbers. While the group planned to be "as visible as possible", co-founder White said that there was a "hangover" from Qatar in 2022 and that human rights were "not at the forefront of the conversation". On 26 June 2024 in Cologne, following England's final UEFA Euro Group C match, 3LP's banner went missing after being placed in the ESTC section for a match between England and Slovenia, and was believed to have been stolen.

=== 2026: North American World Cup boycott ===
In January 2026, by which time 3LP had around 350 members, the group stated that it would not be attending the 2026 FIFA World Cup, based in the United States, Canada and Mexico, in an organised or visible capacity. They cited a "dangerous rollback of human rights in the US", and a resultant "fear that our trans+ family would be at high risk of violence and discrimination, our butch lesbian family would be caught in the crosshairs of anti‑trans legislation around bathrooms and our queer family generally would be a target for abuse." They also noted "tightened US travel rules and visa requirements, the deployment of immigration authorities in certain cities, and high ticket prices." Their statement was strongly worded, and ended with the assertion that the tournament "only promises to line FIFA’s corrupt pockets whilst TV viewers see empty seats and exclude loyal fans whilst creating a real risk of numerous human rights violations based on disability, race, gender and sexuality. Today, and every day, Gianni Infantino should feel ashamed." Football Supporters Europe and the Sport & Rights Alliance stated that they stood in "solidarity" with 3LP, and the football anti-discrimination network Fare stated that it was "sad and regrettable that the most high-profile national team LGBTQ supporters group in the world feel the situation is so difficult that they are unable to travel and have declared a boycott." The largely German LGBTQ soccer fans network, Queer Football Fanclubs, still intends to attend, as do Bleus et Fiers, the LGBTQ fans group for the French national team.
