= Three Lions =

Three Lions may refer to:

== England ==
- The Royal Arms of England, a coat of arms symbolising England (originally England, Normandy and the Duchy of Aquitaine, historically all ruled by Richard I)
- The Three Lions, the nickname of the England national football team
  - Coat of arms of the Football Association
  - "Three Lions" (song), 1996, by Baddiel and Skinner and the Lightning Seeds
  - Three Lions (video game), a football video game
  - The Three Lions, a 2013 play by William Gaminara
  - Three Lions Pride, the LGBTQ supporters' group for the England team
- The Three Lions crest of the England cricket team

== Other countries ==
- The Coat of arms of Baden-Württemberg
- The coat of arms of Dalmatia
- The coat of arms of Denmark, originally the coat of arms of the House of Estridsen which ruled Denmark between 1047 and 1412
- The coat of arms of Estonia, derived from the coat of arms of Denmark

== Other uses ==
- Three Lions Inc., an American photo agency founded in 1937

== See also ==
- Four Lions, a 2010 British black comedy film
- Three Hearts and Three Lions, 1961 fantasy novel
