= The Gay Footballer =

Anonymous Twitter account

The Gay Footballer or @FootballerGay was an anonymous account on the social media website Twitter during July 2019. In its posts beginning on 5 July, the account claimed to be owned by a British association football player in the English Football League Championship, and alleged that he was a closeted gay man under the age of 23. The user promised that he would come out on 24 July by revealing his identity, which if true would have made him the first player to come out as gay while playing in the top four divisions of English football since Justin Fashanu in 1990. The @FootballerGay account was instead deleted on 24 July, after its alleged owner had posted that he was "not strong enough to do this" the previous day.

While live, the account went viral, but received mixed responses including expressions of support from current and former players such as former footballer Gary Lineker, active footballer Marvin Sordell, and rugby player Gareth Thomas, as well as homophobic abuse. There was significant skepticism of the account's legitimacy from other Twitter users and media as well as Justin Fashanu's niece Amal Fashanu, and accusations from LGBTQ activist Peter Tatchell and others that it was a hoax. Media coverage on the topic was international, and there was widespread speculation on the account's true identity.

== Background ==
In 2019, no active professional footballer had come out as gay while playing in the top four divisions of English football since Justin Fashanu in 1990. Fashanu had committed suicide eight years after coming out.

== History ==
=== Launch ===
The Gay Footballer
(@FootballerGay)
tweeted:

I'm a professional footballer, playing for a club in the @SkyBetChamp. I will be revealing my identity soon, but I am a proud gay man, hoping to break the mould. I am under the age of 23, and today I came out to my family. Soon, I will come out publicly. #loveislove #Pride #LGBT

5 July 2019

The user launched their account by following multiple leading LGBTQ organisations and media outlets. The account then posted a tweet on 5 July 2019, which said, "I'm a professional footballer, playing for a club in the [EFL Championship]. I will be revealing my identity soon, but I am a proud gay man, hoping to break the mould. I am under the age of 23, and today I came out to my family. Soon, I will come out publicly." The account's bio similarly read, "I'm a professional footballer, currently playing in The Championship. I will reveal my identity soon, but I am a PROUD gay man."

A few days after launching the account, the user tweeted that their football club was aware of his sexuality and had shown support for his decision to come out to the public, stating that "It was reassuring for them to be fully aware that performance and consistency is based around individuals that are at peace with themselves and the decision to be open is instrumental in ensuring I can be myself." The account tweeted about seeking advice on the issue from his manager and club chairman, noting that "they have assured me that they would both do absolutely everything to support me in this process," and that there would be a further meeting 14 July to discuss the 'next steps'. The account claimed that the club would organise a press conference, also noting that homophobic abuse had been directed at the account since it had opened. On 9 July, sports broadcaster Jim White said he had been in correspondence with the alleged footballer and said "he has my full support." At this time, the account had over 26,000 followers.

Gay rugby player Gareth Thomas has since said he had offered private support to the alleged footballer, and that he had not asked for his name but that the account holder told him the club he had played for. Ryan Atkin, a football referee who had come out as gay in 2017 and whom had been followed by The Gay Footballer on Twitter, said he had followed the account back and similarly sent a direct message of support, and had messaged with him over the following weeks, receiving a phone call from the account holder with a withheld number. Atkin also said they had arranged to meet in person for coffee in London, but that the alleged footballer cancelled this meeting. In direct messages to the BBC, the alleged account holder said he had received "positive messages" as well as "death threats and vile abuse," and wrote that "Whilst I know several others within the game who are gay/bi they are too scared to be open about it, some of them go as far as employing girlfriends to keep it secret. I don't want to do that. I want to be able to go anywhere, with anyone, without the fear of being outed by the rag tops [newspapers] or someone with a camera phone. I truly believe that I need this to be in the open, which will hopefully make it easier for others to do the same." Sky News also spoke to the account holder in a phone interview around 12 July, by which point the account had 31,000 followers, but could not verify if his claims were true despite his insistence that he was "genuine". On 21 July, the user stated that they would announce their identity on 24 July and promised a news conference and media interviews. With the account at over 40,000 followers, many users were arguing that the account was fake at this time.

=== Deletion ===
The Gay Footballer
(@FootballerGay)
tweeted:

I thought I was stronger. I was wrong.

23 July 2019

On 23 July, by which time the account had gained over 50,000 followers, The Gay Footballer put out two posts. The first post read, "I thought I was stronger. I was wrong", and the second explained, "Call me all the names under the sun, belittle me and ridicule me, a lot will, and I can't change that, but I'm not strong enough to do this. Just remember that I've got feelings, without coming out I can't convince anybody otherwise, but this isn't a hoax. I wouldn't do that." The account's bio was also changed to "I thought I was strong enough. I'm not." Following this, the account was deleted on 24 July.

== Responses ==
When it was active, the account went viral. It received a mixed response with some users openly questioning the account's legitimacy and others either tweeting their support or responding with abuse. Former England striker Gary Lineker showed his support, as did Burton Albion forward Marvin Sordell, who wrote, "Wish you nothing but good fortune with this next step in life. So many things will be said, but your vulnerability in this situation is such a powerful sign of your strength! I've got huge respect for you doing something that is monumental for our sport". Tabloid publications such as The Sun alluded that they were aware of the player's identity. On 12 July, Amal Fashanu, the niece of Justin Fashanu, said she doubted the authenticity of the account, and said that if the account were a hoax, it would be "detrimental" to the campaign against homophobia in football and "almost [...] mocking it in a way."

Peter Tatchell
(@PeterTatchell)
tweeted:

Gay footballer cancels plan to come out, claiming he isn’t 'strong enough'. This may be true but he must have known his weakness during the months he has been touting his intention to come out. It smells like a con / hoax. What do you think?

23 July 2019

Amal Fashanu stated that she was "pretty disheartened" by the account's deletion, and became concerned over whether the social environment in football was stopping players from coming out. She also questioned whether Twitter was an appropriate environment in which to come out. The director of sport at LGBTQ charity Stonewall, Robbie de Santos, said that "We do not live in a world that is accepting of everyone's sexual orientation or gender identity. Some of the negative tweets directed at 'The Gay Footballer' were a clear reminder of this. We can't rely on the bravery of individuals alone. It's important we understand and respect why not everyone can be out." De Santos also critiqued the "media frenzy" over the account as well as the speculation around it, which he called "unhelpful". Ryan Atkin said that individuals in football who were or would in the future be looking to come out "will see the support that person has been given", but he also stated his worry that there would be prolonged speculation over whether each of the players under 23 in the Championship were gay. Prominent LGBTQ activist Peter Tatchell, in response to the account's final statement that he was not "strong enough", tweeted that the account "may be true but he must have known his weakness during the months he has been touting his intention to come out. It smells like a con/hoax." Phil Francis, a member of the LGBT football team the Bristol City Panthers, said that while he had hoped the account was genuine, if it was fake it would have showed the lengths homophobic supporters would go to "to make it harder for someone to come out in sport". Openly gay Australian association footballer Andy Brennan compared the Gay Footballer account to an Instagram post made by Australian cricketer James Faulkner in April that year, in which Faulkner had falsely claimed to have a "boyfriend" who was in fact his housemate. Brennan also remarked that, "I personally hope it isn’t a hoax, but even if it is I think you just focus on the positives. The positive energy it created with all the supportive reactions from people was more important than anything negative, and that’s what you have to focus on – otherwise you let the negativity win."

=== Copycat accounts ===
The virality of the initial @FootballerGay account led to copycat accounts being created. This included @thatgaypro, an account which claimed to be manned by a footballer for Norwich City. This account was confirmed as "a hoax and a fraud" by Norwich City's sporting director Stuart Webber.
