= Chelsea Pride =

British LGBTQ supporters' group for Chelsea Football Club

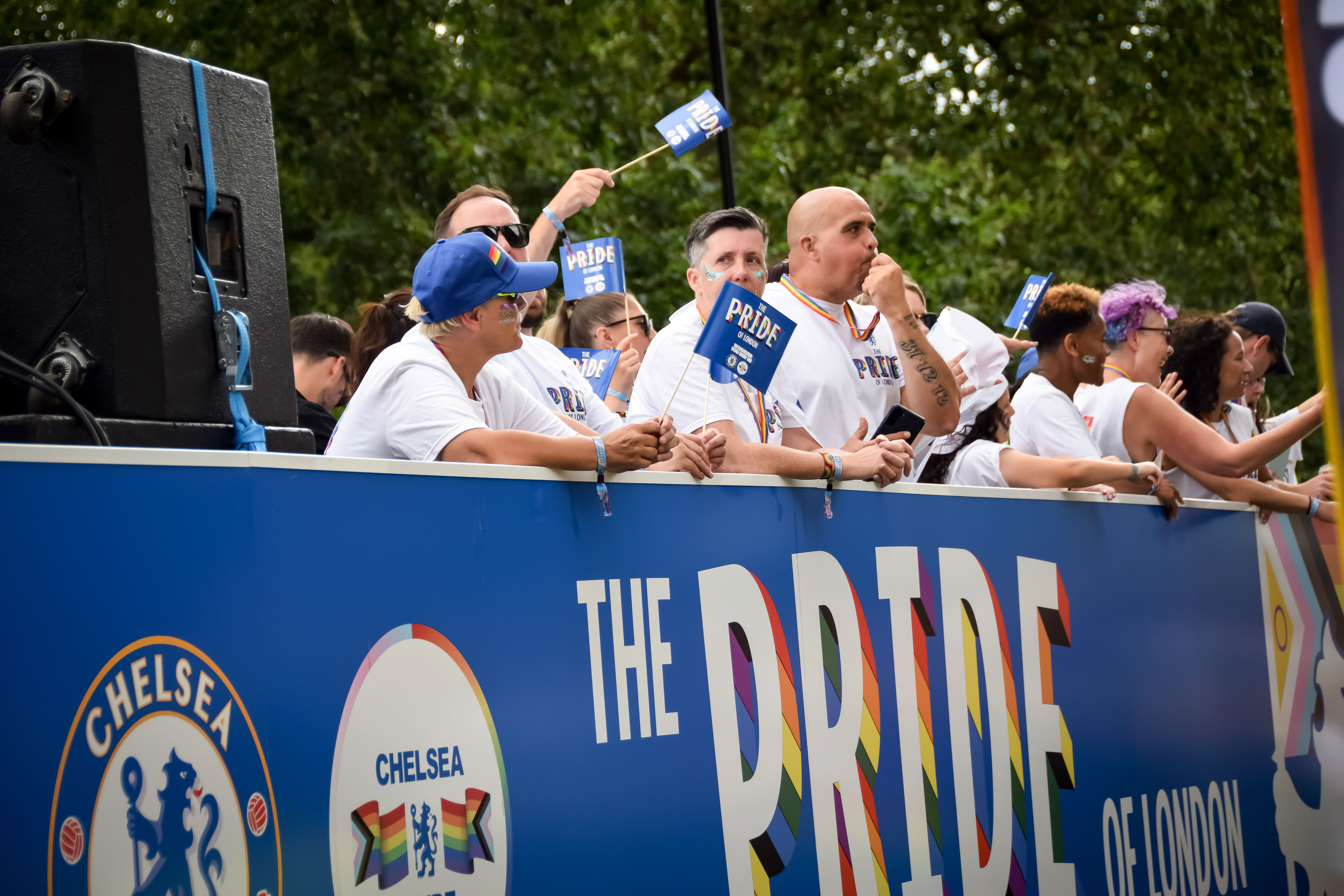
- Chelsea Pride float at Pride in London 2023
- Established: 2016; 10 years ago
- Co-chair: Tracy Brown
- Parent organization: Chelsea F.C.
- Website: chelseapride.co.uk

Chelsea Pride is the LGBTQ supporters' group for Chelsea F.C., a British association football club.

== History ==
Chelsea Pride was established in 2016.

In January 2019 in reaction to then-recent incidents of racist and antisemitic language, Chelsea Pride alongside several other Chelsea fan groups launched Chelsea Together, a group independent of Chelsea F.C. and footballing authorities, out of "a desire to end all forms of discrimination in and around Chelsea Football Club". In October, David Johnstone, the newly elected co-chair of unofficial fan organization the Chelsea Supporters' Trust, had his private messages leaked to The Athletic that showed he had homophobic and transphobic views. He had written that he was "1000% against promoting gay rights", and that LGBTQ relationships were not "the norm" or "natural." Chelsea Pride made a statement to The Athletic that they had "no confidence in Johnstone “to fairly represent their LGBT members as the club’s recognized fan spokesman."

In the lead-up to the recognition of the term "rent boy" as a homophobic slur and thus a hate crime by the Crown Prosecution Service in 2022, Tracy Brown, co-chair of Chelsea Pride, worked alongside Tottenham Hotspur's LGBTQ supporters' association Proud Lilywhites to "collect a number of victim impact statements detailing how hearing this chant negatively impacts the experience of football". Brown called the chant a "taunt" toward LGBTQ fans of Chelsea.

Brown said in March 2023 that homophobia in the men's side of football should be kept away from the women's side. After an April 2023 Chelsea game against Wolverhampton Wanderers involved homophobic chanting. Chelsea condemned the chanting and wrote that it would "continue to work closely with Chelsea Pride and the broader football community to eradicate these vile chants from our game." In 2024, Chelsea Pride condemned homophobic abuse that was being directed at Chelsea's striker Sam Kerr, who had announced she was having a baby with Kristie Mewis, her fiancee.

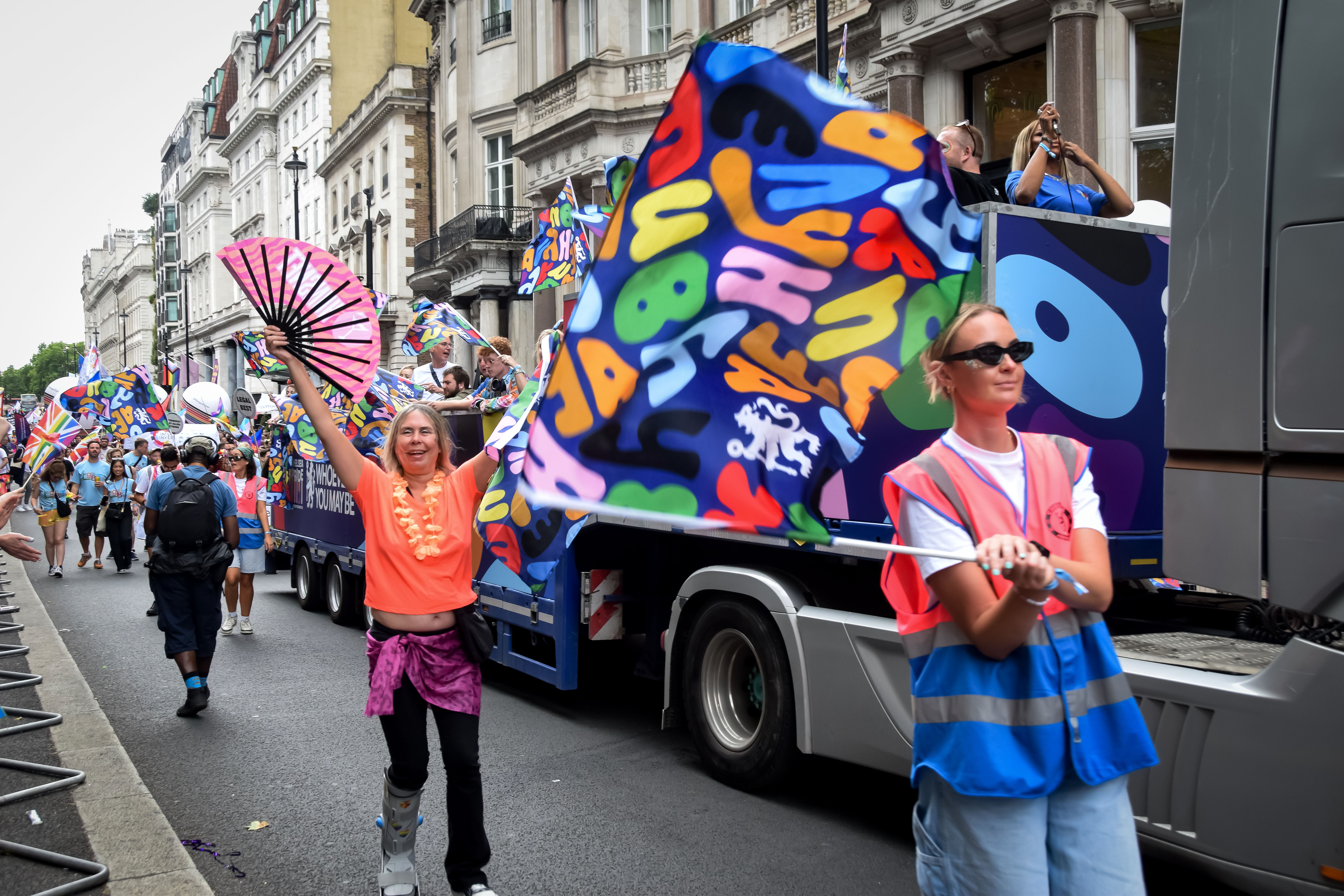
Chelsea Pride at Pride in London 2025

In May 2025, ahead of the 2025 Women's FA Cup final between their respective teams at Wembley Stadium, Chelsea Pride as well as Rainbow Devils, Manchester United's LGBTQ supporters' association, protested against the Football Association's ban of transgender women that had been caused by a UK supreme court decision earlier that year.

Members of Chelsea Pride were reportedly hopeful in response to the appointment of Liam Rosenior as Chelsea's manager in January 2026, as he had previously advocated for greater openness to the LGBTQ community in football; co-chair Tracy Brown said that "We already see values in Liam that resonate deeply with our community." In February, Chelsea Pride condemned the homophobic chanting that took place at an FA Cup fourth round match between Hull City and Chelsea, which had resulted in four arrests, calling it "a stain on our game". In April, Chelsea Pride criticised the response of the Metropolitan Police to what it alleged was "sustained" homophobic chanting of the "rent boy" chant across multiple locations at Wembley Stadium during Chelsea's FA Cup semi-final match against Leeds United. It said the chanting was "widespread and unchecked", that "the gap between what happened and what has been acknowledged is stark", and that "Even when this was explicitly reported as a homophobic hate crime, there was no intervention."
