= TLP =

TLP may refer to:

== Places and facilities ==
- Tanjung Langsat Port, a shipping terminal in Johor, Malaysia
- Tarbes–Lourdes–Pyrénées Airport, an international airport in southern France
- Tirana logistic park, an industrial park in Albania

== Businesses and organizations ==
- Tehreek-e-Labbaik Pakistan TLP, Far-right Islamic Extremist party in Pakistan.
- Tactical Leadership Programme, a NATO pilot training organization
- Tanzania Labour Party, a political party in Tanzania
- Telefones de Lisboa e Porto, now Portugal Telecom
- The Library Project, a non-profit organization that donates books and libraries in China and Vietnam
- Three Lions Pride, the LGBTQ supporters' group for the England national football team
- Tradition Records, catalog code TLP, a record label 1956–1966
- Transitional Living Program for Older Homeless Youth, an American social assistance program
- TransMontaigne Partners L.P., stock ticker TLP
- Trinidad Labour Party, a former political party in Trinidad and Tobago

== Science and technology ==
=== Biology and medicine ===
- Thalidomide, lenalidomide and pomalidomide, in the development of analogs of thalidomide drugs
- Thermolysin-like proteinase, an enzyme
- Transient lingual papillitis, lumps on the tongue

=== Computing, electronics and software ===
- Thread level parallelism, an exploitation of task parallelism in computing
- Traffic Light Protocol, a system for classifying sensitive information
- Transaction layer packet, an encapsulation of data in the PCI Express serial bus specification
- Transactional license program, a type of open volume software license
- Transmission level point, a telecommunications signal testing point
- Transmission-line pulse, a method of testing electronic circuits for tolerance to electrostatic discharge
- Translinear principle, a concept in translinear circuits

=== Other uses in science and technology ===
- Satish Dhawan Space Centre Third Launch Pad, a rocket launch site in India
- Tension-leg platform, a type of offshore platform used in production of oil or gas
- Transient lunar phenomenon, a rare illumination event on the surface of the Moon

== Other uses ==
- Filomeno Mata Totonac language, ISO 939-3 code TLP
- Tractatus Logico-Philosophicus, a work by Austrian philosopher Ludwig Wittgenstein
- Billboard 200, a chart with the shortcut "TLP"
