= Proud Canaries =

Norwich City FC's LGBT Fans & Friends Group

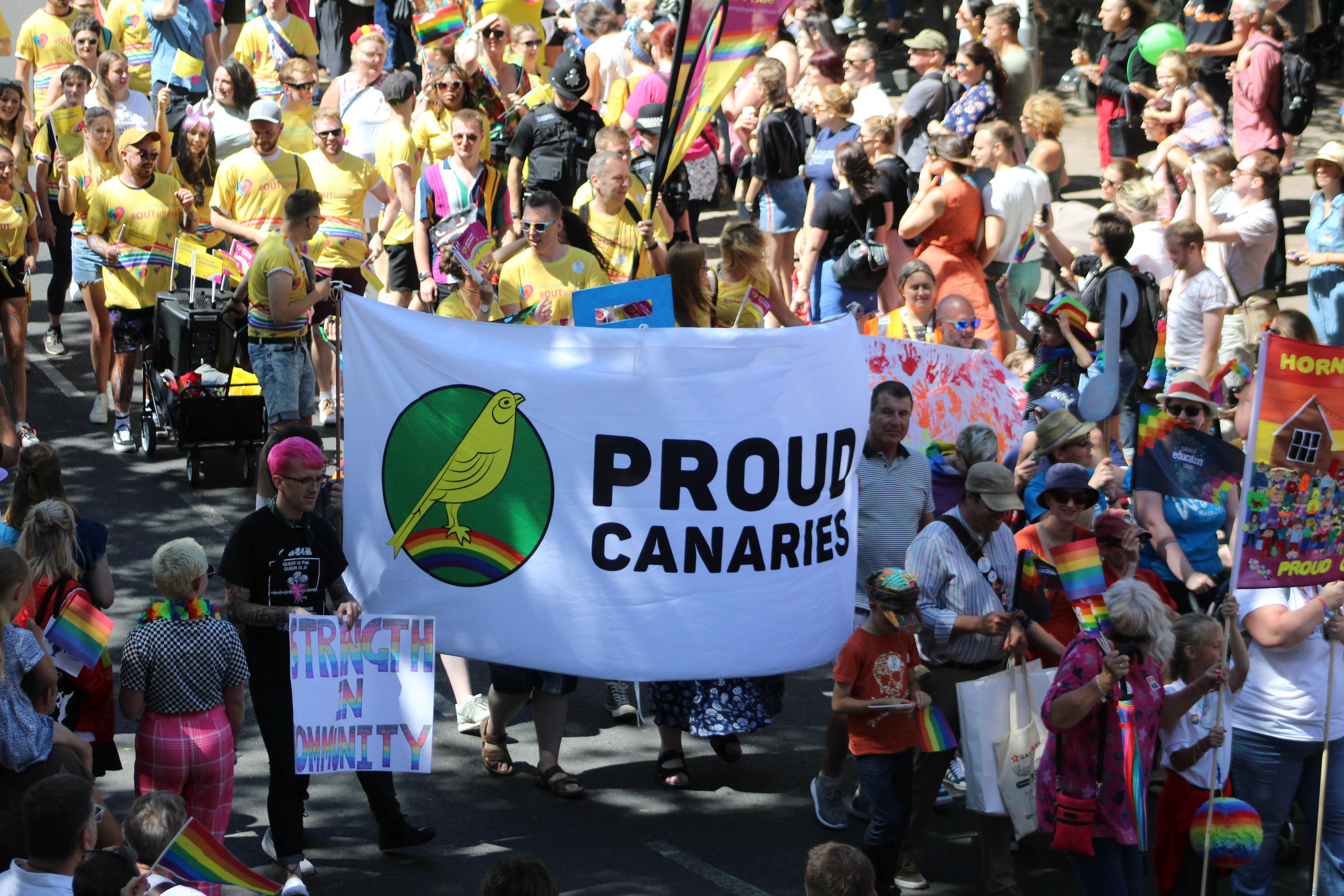
Proud Canaries at Norwich Pride 2018

Proud Canaries is the Norwich City FC's LGBT Fans & Friends Group with the vision 'Challenging discrimination for better enjoyment of the beautiful game'. Proud Canaries formed in October 2013 and was officially welcomed on the Carrow Rd pitch at the Norwich City game v Tottenham Hotspur in February 2014 and is the second officially recognised LGBT supporters' group in the country, the first being Gay Gooners, the Arsenal FC LGBT group. Proud Canaries is a social forum for Lesbian, Gay, Bisexual and Trans supporters of Norwich City FC and works with the Club to make Carrow Road, the club's ground, a safer and more pleasant place for everyone by promoting the inclusion and challenging discrimination.

== Key figures ==
Stephen Fry became the honorary president of the group in February 2014. Amal Fashanu, Justin Fashanu's niece is patron. Di Cunningham is the organiser of the group.

== Achievements ==
Norwich City FC and Chief Executive David McNally have met with group representatives and on three occasions the group has paraded on the pitch at half time.

National anti-discrimination organization Kick It Out (organisation) invited Proud Canaries to deliver workshops at a Pride in Football and Football v Homophobia event in London 2014.

The Football Association invited the group to Wembley to watch the England–Slovenia game 15 November 2014 and the Proud Canaries banner was hung alongside those of other LGBT fan groups to demonstrate their commitment to fighting prejudice.

Chief Executive David McNally is working with the group and indicates the club is fully committed to combating any homophobia at Carrow Road. They routinely display the Stonewall 'Some People Are Gay - Get Over It' in club colours on the scoreboard and all stewards have been trained to deal with homophobic incidents; in conjunction with the police if necessary. In addition, the club endorse reporting of discriminatory behaviour through the Kick It Out app. At the end of the 2014/15 season Kick It Out awarded NCFC their Equality Standard to recognise their work in promoting equality and tackling discrimination citing their connection with Proud Canaries as an example of good practice.

During the 2014/15 season Norwich City CFC received 4 reports of homophobia at Carrow Road – the outcomes of the investigations was that offenders received final warnings and were informed that any repetition would lead to banning. Some campaigners have suggested that the club is not applying a zero-tolerance policy by not dealing with offences with summary and permanent exclusion. Proud Canaries position on the issue is that homophobic abuse in English football has generally been tolerated and ignored and that some supporters need a little time and encouragement to process the change in expectations of other fans and club officers.
