= Fashanu =

Fashanu is a surname. Notable people with the surname include:

- Amal Fashanu (born 1988), British presenter, journalist, and fashion designer, daughter of John Fashanu
- John Fashanu (born 1962), British television presenter and footballer, younger brother of Justin Fashanu, father of Amal Fashanu
- Justin Fashanu (1961–1998), British footballer and gay activist, older brother of John Fashanu
- Olu Fashanu (born 2002), American football player
