= Chelsea rent boy =

British association football chant

"Chelsea rent boy" is a football chant and homophobic slur used by opponents of British football club Chelsea F.C. against its fans as well as its current and former players. "Rent boy" is British slang that "originated in the 19th century and saw wider use from the 1960s. It refers to a male sex worker that sells sex to other men. The origin of its specific use against Chelsea, which began in the 1980s, is unclear; it may have originated from tabloid newspaper reports, possibly from The Sun, about the hooligan group known as the Chelsea Headhunters, or from the reputation of Earl's Court in the London borough of Chelsea for homosexual activity. The chant itself is, "Chelsea rent boys, Chelsea rent boys, hello, hello," to the tune of the song "Hello, Hello, I'm Back Again" by convicted sex offender Gary Glitter. It is often delivered aggressively.

In 2022, the British Crown Prosecution Service (CPS) confirmed that "rent boy" is a homophobic slur and thus punishable as a hate crime. Since 2023, use of the chant can also result in a fine imposed by the Football Association (FA) on the chanter's club. Other possible punishments for chanters include stadium bans and football banning orders. Tracy Brown, chair of Chelsea's LGBTQ supporters' association Chelsea Pride, has called the chant a "taunt" toward LGBTQ fans of the club.

== Background ==
The term "rent boy", referring to a male sex worker, specifically one who sells sex to other men, is British slang which arose in the 19th century and saw wider use from the 1960s onward.

== History ==
=== 1980s: Unclear origins ===
The specific use of the term in reference to Chelsea is commonly thought to have emerged from tabloid newspaper reports in the 1980s about the right-wing hooligan group Chelsea Headhunters which alleged that in a police raid, one of its members had been found in a bed with a male sex worker. Chelsea club historian Rick Glanville has identified this news story as a report from The Sun on a police raid of alleged Headhunter Dale Green who reportedly shared a multi-bedroom house with a male friend. Glanville has said that the tabloid falsely reported that Green and his friend had been found in bed together, when in fact Green was in the hall and his friend was elsewhere wearing only boxer shorts. Academic Peter Evans has noted that it references an historical link between Earl's Court in the borough of Chelsea and high levels of homosexual activity which included young male sex workers.

=== 2019–2021: Changing reputation ===
Numerous uses of the chant were collated by anti-discrimination organisation Kick It Out and corroborated by Chelsea and West Ham United LGBTQ groups at the clubs' FA Cup match in December 2019, during the height of Stonewall's Rainbow Laces campaign for that year. West Ham responded that it "in no way condone[d] any behaviour that falls short of the highest standards which the club sets when it comes to equality."

At a local Somerset league game in October 2020, players for AFC Shipham walked off the pitch and ended the game after a player on the opposing team Portishead Town allegedly used the "rent boy" insult. In August 2021, fans of Liverpool used the phrase toward Billy Gilmour who was playing for Norwich City on loan from Chelsea during the teams' Premier League opener at Carrow Road. This incident was condemned by Norwich, Liverpool, several LGBTQ groups, and the Kick It Out. Edleen John, the Equality, Diversity and Inclusion Director at the FA, said the slur was comparable to racist abuse. Liverpool manager Jürgen Klopp appeared in a video interview with Paul Amann, the founder of Liverpool's LGBTQ supporters' association Kop Outs, to speak about the chant, and during this interview said, "If you don't think about what you sing: you are an idiot." At this time, the FA was working to reclassify the phrase as discriminatory with the police and CPS. The same month, the FA introduced measures for permanent bans from all Premier League matches if an individual was found to have behaved in a discriminatory or abusive way. In January 2022, the chant was heard at the Tottenham–Chelsea League Cup semi-final, as well as at the Millwall versus Crystal Palace match in the third round of the FA Cup when the chant was targeted at on-loan Crystal Palace midfielder Conor Gallagher.

=== 2022–23: Hate crime designation and FA policy changes ===
In January 2022, the Crown Prosecution Service confirmed that it considered the term "rent boy" a homophobic slur, and thus a hate crime. Prior to the 2022 FA Cup final between Liverpool and Chelsea, Liverpool fan Paul Boardman was heard shouting the term at Wembley Park tube station; police seized his football ticket and gave him a dispersal order and he was barred from entering the stadium. Boardman would later plead guilty to using threatening words or behaviour to cause harassment, alarm or distress, and was sentenced under Section 5 of the Public Order Act 1986 to a £500 fine at Westminster Magistrates' Court on 5 December 2022.

During the 2022–23 Premier League season, the "rent boy" chant could be heard at Chelsea's matches against Nottingham Forest and Manchester City, as well as at the match between Manchester United F.C. and Everton F.C. in January 2023 at which the chant appeared to have been used by United fans against former Chelsea player and manager and then-Everton manager Frank Lampard. The FA's governing body launched an investigation into this latter incident and made a statement; "We strongly condemn the use of the term 'rent boy' and we are determined to drive it out of our game. We continue to work closely with the Crown Prosecution Service, as well as the UK Football Policing Unit, in relation to the use of this term." Manchester United released a statement that it would continue to campaign against discriminatory abuse, and United's LGBTQ supporters' association Rainbow Devils called for the club to identify the responsible individuals and take action against them. The same month, following years of campaigning by Chelsea Pride and other LGBTQ fan groups, the FA made another statement that clubs could be charged with disciplinary action for their fans' engagement in discriminatory behaviour, which included the use of the term "rent boy". It said;

Today, The FA has formally written to all clubs across the Premier League, EFL, National League, Women's Super League, Women's Championship and Steps 2-4, to remind them that it can pursue formal disciplinary action against any club whose supporters engage in discriminatory behaviour, now including the use of the term 'Rent Boy'. This important step follows the recent successful prosecution of an individual by the Crown Prosecution Service for homophobic abuse, specifically relating to the term 'Rent Boy'. The FA has now informed all clubs that it considers the 'Rent Boy' chant to be a breach of the FA Rules. These rules apply to the conduct of supporters at both home and away fixtures, and clubs at all levels of English football have a responsibility to ensure their spectators behave appropriately when attending matches.

In July 2023, the Wolverhampton Wanderers became the first club receive a punishment from the FA for the "rent boy" chant alone, which led to two breaches of FA Rule E21. The club was fined £100,000 ($126,000 USD) by the FA for failing to control the incident. At another match in August 2023 between Brighton & Hove Albion and Luton Town, fans from the latter team directed the same chant against former Chelsea midfielder Billy Gilmour again. Luton Town was fined £120,000 for this incident. Having been punished for singing "Chelsea rent boy" earlier in the year, Wolverhampton Wanderers fans seated in the South Bank section of the crowd for a match against Chelsea that December created a new chant which Peter Evans has argued is a clear replacement for the "rent boy" chant; "We know what you are, we know what you are, we can’t sing it, but we know what you are."

Early in the 2023–24 Premier League in September, two Nottingham Forest fans were arrested for using the chant during the team's match against Chelsea at Stamford Bridge. This chanting was believed to be from a very small minority of Nottingham Forest supporters and not adopted by the wider majority of fans.

=== 2024–present: Continued chants, fines and expulsions ===
In September 2024, several Tottenham Hotspur fans attending the club's Premier League away match against Manchester United sang homophobic chants on two occasions, one of which, in the match's first half, was the "rent boy" chant directed at former Chelsea midfielder Mason Mount who had been introduced as a substitute for Tottenham. The FA charged Tottenham with misconduct for failure to control its supporters. Tottenham was able to negotiate its initial £150,000 fine imposed by the FA down to £75,000 through an appeal on the grounds of the club's reduced culpability, partially due to its work with its LGBTQ supporters' association Proud Lilywhites. In February 2025, the FA received complaints from Kick It Out that the chant was used by West Ham United fans in the 62nd minute of that February's Premier League match against Chelsea at Stamford Bridge. An investigation had found that a "very significant number" of supporters were involved, categorising it as "mass chanting" for 40 seconds. The commission found that a "very significant lack of adequate specific pre-match planning" on West Ham's part meant that those responsible could not be identified for sanctions, and said club personnel deployed in the away end failed to detect the chanting. West Ham admitted to the charge that March, and in May were fined £120,000 ($161,830 USD) by the FA for the incident.

A 2025 study of football supporters on independent fan forums by Peter Evans in the International Journal of Sport and Society found that 53% of 1,805 respondents believed the "rent boy" chant was "homophobic", with 39% answering that it was "banter" and 9% being "unsure". 56% of middle-class fans and 40% of working-class fans supported ejection or prosecution for the chant. The "rent boy" chant was seen as more homophobic than the other chant asked about in the study, "We can see you, we can see you, we can see you holding hands". It also found that 6% of the supporters considered the rent boy chant to be a hate crime.

In September 2025, Manchester United stated that anyone who was to engage in discriminatory chanting such as the "rent boy" chant could be banned from the club's Old Trafford stadium and face criminal charges. A Manchester United fan was banned from the club for three years after using the term in a homophobic social media post about Chelsea in November that year. In March 2026, Wrexham warned its fans against using the chant and stated that those that did so would face "serious consequences" including ejection from the SToK Cae Ras for three years, receiving a football banning order, and facing criminal charges. In February 2026 around the 25th minute of an FA Cup match between Hull City and Chelsea, the chant was used. In the 44th minute of this match, a loudspeaker announcement confirmed this incident and in the 60th minute another announcement confirmed that arrests had been made.
