= Gay Gooners =

British LGBTQ supporters' group for Arsenal F.C.

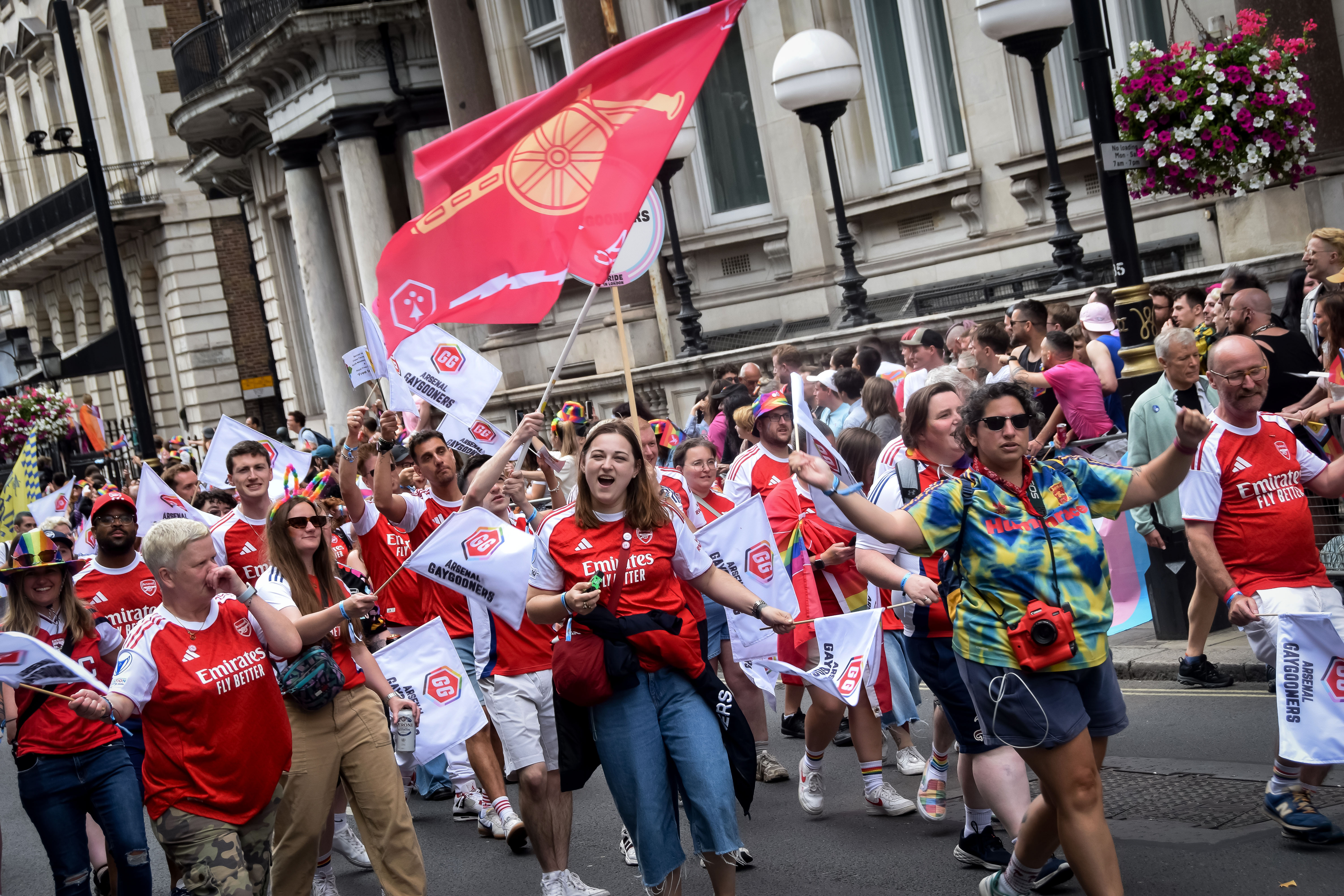
- The Gay Gooners at Pride in London 2025
- Established: February 16, 2013; 13 years ago
- Founder: Stewart Selby
- Location: London, England
- Members: 2,500 (2025)
- Co-chairs: Carl Fearn and Jacob Jefferson
- Parent organization: Arsenal F.C.
- Website: arsenal.com/fanzone/gay-gooners: Gay Gooners on X

The Gay Gooners, occasionally stylised as GayGooners, are the official LGBTQ supporters' group for Arsenal F.C., a British association football club. Formed in February 2013, they are widely recognised as the first LGBTQ supporters' club in English football, and the first LGBTQ supporters' group in UK football to march at Pride in London. They have since grown to become the largest such group in England, with more than 2,000 members and allies as of 2025, according to the club.

The group was founded with the aim of fighting homophobia in football, and functions as a social and community space for LGBTQ Arsenal fans to attend matches together and participate in club events. The group works with organisations such as Rainbow Laces and Kick It Out, and have marched at Pride in London since their founding in 2013.

The group has campaigned on wider LGBTQ issues, including protesting outside the Qatari embassy in London ahead of the 2022 FIFA World Cup and raising concerns about Arsenal's sponsorship deal with the Rwanda Development Board as well as campaigning against homophobic chanting at matches. It was shortlisted for the Football v Homophobia Supporters Group Award in 2024. The group's name has been the subject of internal discussion, with some former members questioning whether it is sufficiently intersectional.

== History ==
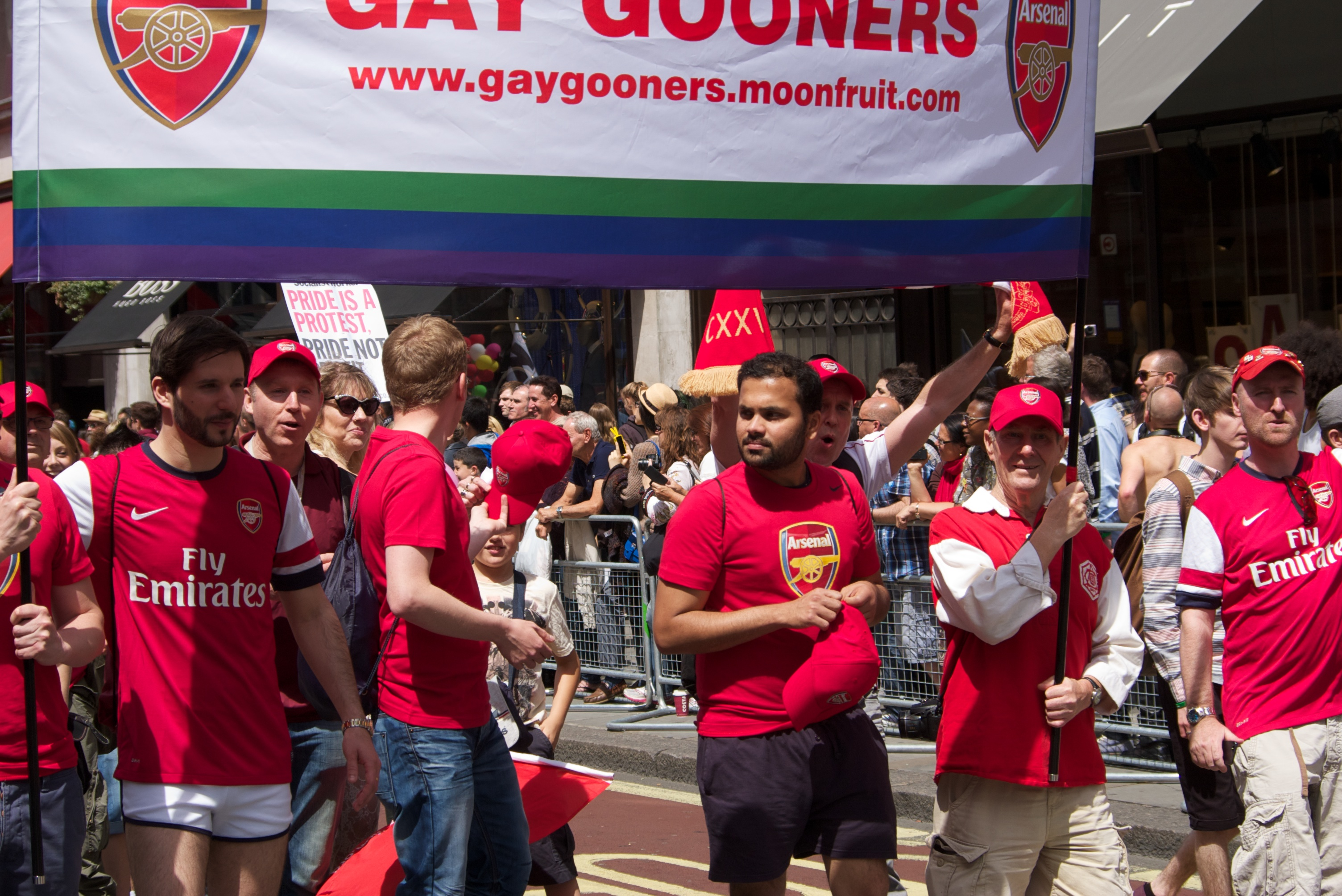
Months after the group was founded in February, the Gay Gooners attended Pride in London 2013

Organised LGBT+ football fandom in Britain predates the group: the Gay Football Supporters Network was founded in the late 1980s. According to the group's own history, the network began in 1989 among fans meeting at a pub in Islington, most of them Arsenal supporters, and gay Arsenal fans within it met before matches and travelled to away games together through the 1990s. In Germany, a national network of LGBT+ fan clubs, Queer Football Fanclubs, held its first conference in 2007.

According to Arsenal F.C., the Gay Gooners were founded in February 2013. Its origins came from a friendship between two amateur referees who had officiated together at the International Gay and Lesbian Football Association tournaments, Stewart Selby and Dave Raval. From the 2010–11 season, Selby represented the LGBTQ+ community on Arsenal's Supporters Forum, and by 2012 had secured the backing of then chief executive Ivan Gazidis and communications director Mark Gonnella for an official LGBT+ supporters' group. According to Selby, a short piece in the matchday programme in late 2012 was the first step towards the group's formation. On 26 January 2013, Arsenal's internationally televised FA Cup tie away to Brighton & Hove Albion was marred by sustained homophobic chanting. The following month, Arsenal hosted the group in a box at the home FA Cup fixture against Blackburn Rovers on 16 February 2013, a date chosen to coincide with LGBT History Month and which the Gay Gooners regard as their founding. Raval and Zed Lomax became the group's first co-chairs. When Arsenal announced the group's launch on social media, the post attracted a large volume of abuse; Raval later recalled that the group trended on Twitter in the UK that day largely because of abusive replies.

Arsenal became the first major English football club to recognise a group of its kind that year. Following this recognition, there was an increase in LGBTQ football fan groups that were officially recognised by their clubs.

The Gay Gooners attended their first Pride in London parade in 2013. There was an apprehension from some members about being identified on television, so Arsenal supplied them with "some caps and a small banner" to represent the club. Their presence as an officially backed football supporters group drew comments from other participants of that parade. When the club and the group announced their participation in the following year's parade, they received widespread support online but also homophobic abuse, much of it from other Arsenal supporters.

At the beginning of the 2013–14 season, Arsenal became the first football club in Europe to drape a rainbow banner over one of its stadium's hoardings. That season, the club captain Thomas Vermaelen and vice-captain Mikel Arteta wore rainbow laces in the first awareness campaign of its kind in football. In 2014 the group was one of four LGBT+ supporters' groups, with Manchester City's Canal Street Blues, Norwich City's Proud Canaries and Tottenham Hotspur's Proud Lilywhites, that formed Pride in Football, a national alliance of LGBT+ fan groups. According to the group, founding co-chair Zed Lomax led its involvement. In September 2014, Arsenal players including Arteta, Santi Cazorla and Olivier Giroud appeared in an advertisement for the Rainbow Laces campaign produced by Stonewall, Paddy Power and the Gay Football Supporters Network. By February 2015, they had 250 members, and Arsenal was allowing the group space in their programme and other official channels to publicise their message. That month, the Gay Gooners played their own version of the north London derby by taking part in a five-a-side match against fellow prominent LGBTQ supporters' association for Tottenham Hotspur, the Proud Lilywhites. The match was officiated by Steffen Freund. In February 2015, former Arsenal player and coach Pat Rice unveiled a new banner for the group on the pitch.

By 2015, comedian and actor Matt Lucas had become a patron of the Gay Gooners. By April 2017, the group had 500 members, of whom 40 per cent were women. By June 2018, the Gay Gooners had over 650 members, and in March 2019, they had 775 members, of which 40% were women and 10% lived overseas, in some cases in countries where being gay was illegal. Héctor Bellerín, a right-back for Arsenal, spoke with the group over a video call in 2020, noting that he had received homophobic abuse himself. In February 2021, then Arsenal Women player Katie McCabe described seeing the group's banner during a visit to the Emirates Stadium before she signed for the club as having made her feel immediately accepted, and cited it as a significant factor in her decision to join Arsenal when the opportunity arose. They had around 1,000 members by November 2021. According to Selby, the group had reached almost 1,400 members globally by February 2023. That month, after Arsenal shared a member's story on social media to mark the group's tenth anniversary, the club blocked a number of accounts that had posted abusive replies.

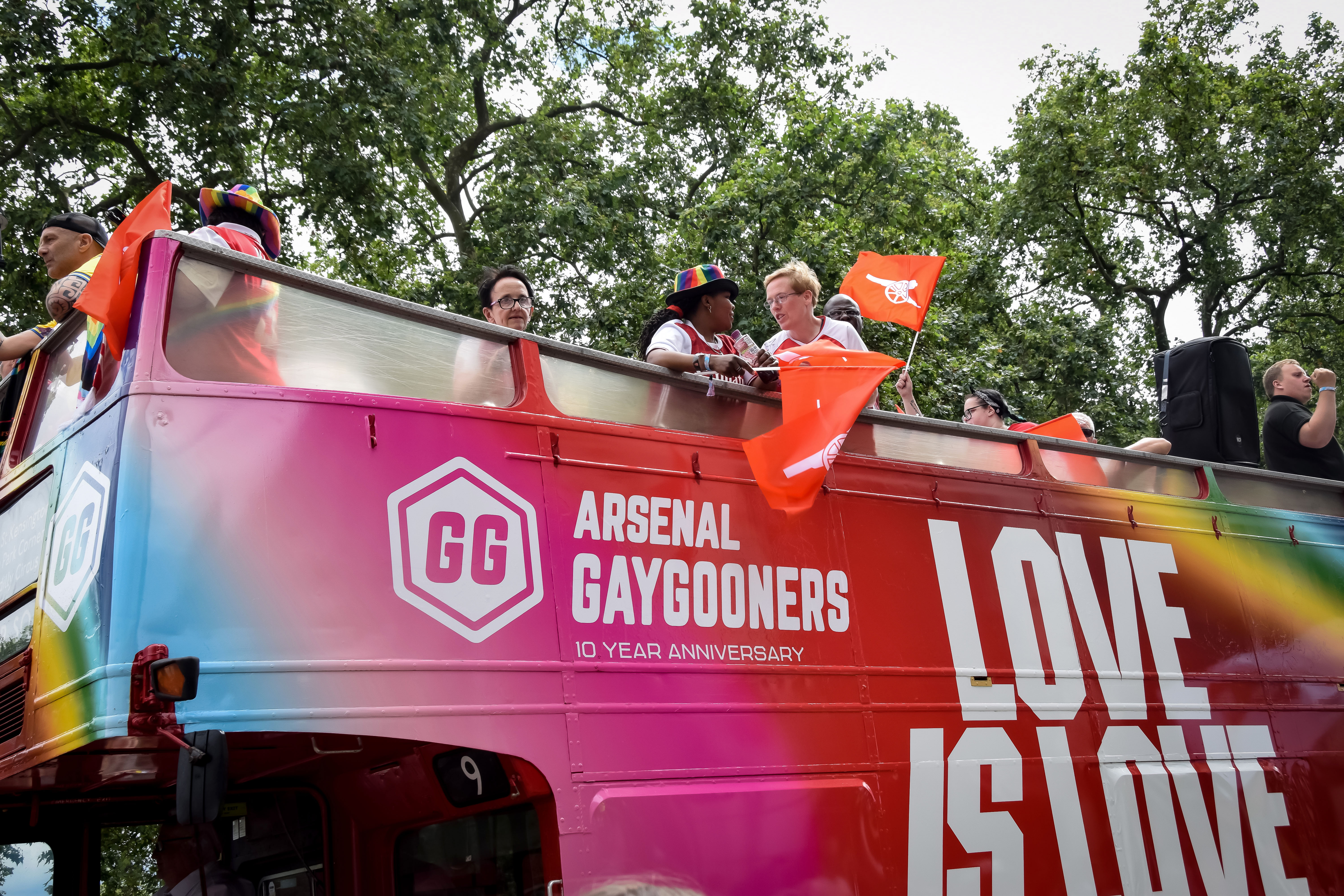
The Gay Gooners riding an open-topped bus at Pride in London 2023

On 19 November 2022, the eve of the 2022 FIFA World Cup in Qatar, Gay Gooners members joined a protest organised by LGBTQ rights campaigner Peter Tatchell outside the Qatari embassy in London, opposing the country's anti-LGBTQ policies. The group later said it had faced a backlash from some football fans over its stance, but had considered it important to speak out. Jen Beattie joined the group for Pride in London 2022. As of 2023, the Gay Gooners had attended Pride in London since 2013 according to co-chairman Carl Fearn. That year in June, they attended the march on an open-topped Routemaster bus. The Gay Gooners by this point had 1,600 members across 51 countries. In 2024 the group was shortlisted for the Football v Homophobia Supporters Group Award, which was won by West Bromwich Albion's Proud Baggies; Arsenal was shortlisted for the Professional Game Award the same year.

At Pride in London 2025, the Gay Gooners marched alongside an Arsenal Pride float and were joined by Arsenal Women captain Kim Little. Co-chair Jacob Jefferson told BRICKS Magazine that the group's banner, displayed at every home game, signalled that LGBTQ fans "belong here just as much as any other fan".

In November 2025 when Arsenal ended an eight-year partnership with the Rwanda Development Board that had included the words "Visit Rwanda" on the team's kit sleeves, the Gay Gooners welcomed the decision, stating that they were "uncomfortable with the deal from the start and made signification [sic] representations to Arsenal through official channels since 2021." In a survey of its 2,500-strong membership in July 2025, the Gay Gooners found that only two per cent of respondents wanted the sponsorship renewed, whilst 86 per cent wanted it ended and a replacement found.

On 4 July 2026, following Arsenal's Premier League title-winning season, the group marched at Pride in London alongside the club's Champions parade bus.

== Organisation and leadership ==
The Gay Gooners are run by a volunteer committee. Dave Raval, one of the founding co-chairs, was chair in 2017. In 2021 the group was chaired by George Rice, and by early 2022 its co-chairs were Carl Fearn and Joe White. Fearn remained co-chair in 2024. Jacob Jefferson, the group's campaigns officer by 2023, had become co-chair by December 2024. Angus Moorat, the group's secretary as of 2025, was elected to Arsenal's Advisory Board in 2021. Fearn has spoken publicly about the importance of visibility and belonging for LGBTQ supporters, including during Arsenal's participation in Pride in London 2024. Jefferson joined the group at the age of 18, at a time when he did not feel able to be openly gay around other football fans, and has said it gave him a place where he could be himself, free from the homophobic comments that had made the sport feel unwelcoming. Jefferson has described the group's long-term aim as being to become unnecessary, while acknowledging that this remained a long way off. In 2024, the current Gay Gooners co-chairs Carl Fearn and Jacob Jefferson were photographed with Arsenal captain Martin Ødegaard during the club's LGBTQ+ inclusion activities.

An oral history project published by London Metropolitan University in 2025 documented the experiences of LGBTQ Arsenal supporters, including Gay Gooners members, and described the group as the "world's biggest LGBTQ+ football fan club".

The group holds meet-ups near the Emirates Stadium ahead of home fixtures, and organises group travel to away matches and regular social events. Members receive a newsletter that covers forthcoming events and LGBTQ football news. Members have helped train the club's stewards in dealing with homophobic abuse. Members also use the club's official ticket transfer system to share tickets so that they can attend matches together. As interest in the women's game grew, the group developed a regular presence at Arsenal Women fixtures home and away. The group runs an annual five-a-side tournament at the Arsenal Hub for the club's supporters' groups; in February 2025 it was won by Jewish Gooners for the second year running, with the trophy presented by former Arsenal player Lee Dixon. The group also enters a team in the club's annual Arsenal for Everyone tournament. More than ten per cent of the membership are allies who are not LGBTQ themselves. According to a long-standing member, the group meets regularly with Arsenal on matters ranging from matchday welfare to LGBTQ+ initiatives.

== Campaigning ==
In January 2022, co-chair Carl Fearn heard homophobic chanting in a pub near the Emirates Stadium after a home match against Burnley, and raised it with the club. Arsenal responded by distributing anti-discrimination material to pubs around the Emirates Stadium, and dedicated the following month's home fixture against Brentford to the Gay Gooners group, showing a film featuring members on the stadium screens and allocating an executive box to LGBT+ supporters attending a match for the first time.

In December 2024, ahead of Arsenal's designated Rainbow Laces fixture against Manchester United, co-chair Jacob Jefferson told the Daily Mirror that the group's priority for the campaign was making supporters feel safe in stadiums and making it easier to report abuse without leaving their seat. He noted that allies were an important part of this, since "quite often the reporting comes from non-LGBT people". Jefferson also said that visible player support had become less common than in the campaign's early years, when Arsenal players appeared in some of its first advertising, suggesting that online abuse had made players more reluctant, and that the group's reach depended on the club actively giving it a platform.

== Criticism ==
The group's name has drawn internal criticism. Zed Lomax, one of the group's first co-chairs, later left the group, saying the name was not intersectional and excluded parts of the LGBT+ community. Arsenal had also produced the group's original flag, but without consulting members over the wording that they wanted included, which was added to later versions. The question of the group's name, however, was not resolved.
