= Ryan Atkin =

English football referee (born 1984 or 1985)

Ryan Atkin (born 1984 or 1985) is an English professional football referee. In 1999, he began as a referee in his home town Plymouth at age 14. Atkin became the first official to come out as gay in British professional football as well as the second official to come out in professional British sport in 2017, when he was officiating in the sixth tier National League South and also being a fourth official in the English Football League (EFL). As of 2025, he was the tournament director and a referee of the International Gay and Lesbian Football Association (IGLFA) and was officiating matches in the Women's Super League, EFL, and the FA Cup.

== Career ==
Atkin began refereeing at age 14, in his home town of Plymouth in 1999. For his first match in a Devon league, he forgot to bring his whistle, stating that he instead used his voice for the first half and used a whistle found by his grandfather for the second half. In 2009, he was promoted to duties as an assistant referee in the EFL. Atkin has publicly stated that he is "embarrassed" about a match he officiated between Staines Town and Welling United in 2013. He stepped down from his EFL assistant referee duties following the 2015–16 season, electing to follow the main career path for referees.

For the 2017–18 season, Atkin began officiating in the sixth tier National League South, as well as in the National League North, and also carried out some fourth official duties in the English Football League (EFL). By 2025, he was the tournament director of the International Gay and Lesbian Football Association (IGLFA) as well as a referee for the association, and was officiating matches in the Women's Super League, EFL, and the FA Cup.

== Personal life and activism ==
Atkin has said that he knew he was gay since age 21. Prompted by a then-recent bolstering of commitments made by the governing bodies of football to LGBTQ inclusion, he came out as gay publicly on 10 August 2017, at the age of 32, through an interview with Sky Sports. This made him the first British professional football official to come out and the second official to come out in professional British sport after rugby union referee Nigel Owens. The announcement was coordinated between Atkin, the Football Association (FA), Stonewall, Sky Sports and referees' body Professional Game Match Officials Limited (PGMOL). Mike Riley, managing director of the PGMOL, supported Atkin and remarked that "people perform better when they can be themselves, which is a hugely powerful message", and the Head of Campaigns at Stonewall, Robbie de Santos, said Atkin was an "inspiring role model". Neale Barry, Head of Senior Referee Development at The Football Association, offered the FA's "full backing" to Atkin. His first match after coming out was an Eastbourne Borough home game against Welling United. Atkin has since stated that after coming out, he "got a lot of people just patting me on the back and saying 'well done, it doesn't matter that you are gay'." Atkin has agreed with this, stating that "being gay doesn't matter in the context of refereeing a football match. But if I am speaking about equality and diversity then I am going to mention that I am gay because it is relevant." He has also stated that he received death threats and "inappropriate, discriminatory language" from the stands after coming out. The same year in November, Atkin put his support behind the Rainbow Laces campaign, stating that "You don't have to be LGBT to be a supporter of the campaign", while also noting that "wearing rainbow laces for a game is not enough."

In 2018, he attended the 2018 FIFA World Cup in Russia, and spoke with LGBTQ people in Russia, and the next year supported the then-upcoming 2022 FIFA World Cup in Qatar where homosexuality is illegal, stating that it "lays paving slabs to hopefully build a path to where further discussions can take place." In 2019, Atkin was named as one of Stonewall's Sport Champions of that year. He remarked in November 2019 that he has spoken to many closeted gay people in sport since coming out. Atkin continued to support the Rainbow Laces campaign in 2020, noting that he did not regret coming out. Atkin supported Mike Dean, a fellow football official, in 2021 after Dean was subject to death threats in reaction to his involvement two controversial red card decisions. In 2025, he appeared on the BBC's LGBT Sport Podcast to encourage clubs to do more to tackle homophobia and racism in football. He said that year that conversations about LGBTQ topics had become "very difficult" in recent years due to political shifts. He supported the option for players to wear a rainbow armband at the UEFA Women's Euro 2025.
