= Proud Lilywhites =

British LGBTQ supporters' group for Tottenham Hotspur Football Club

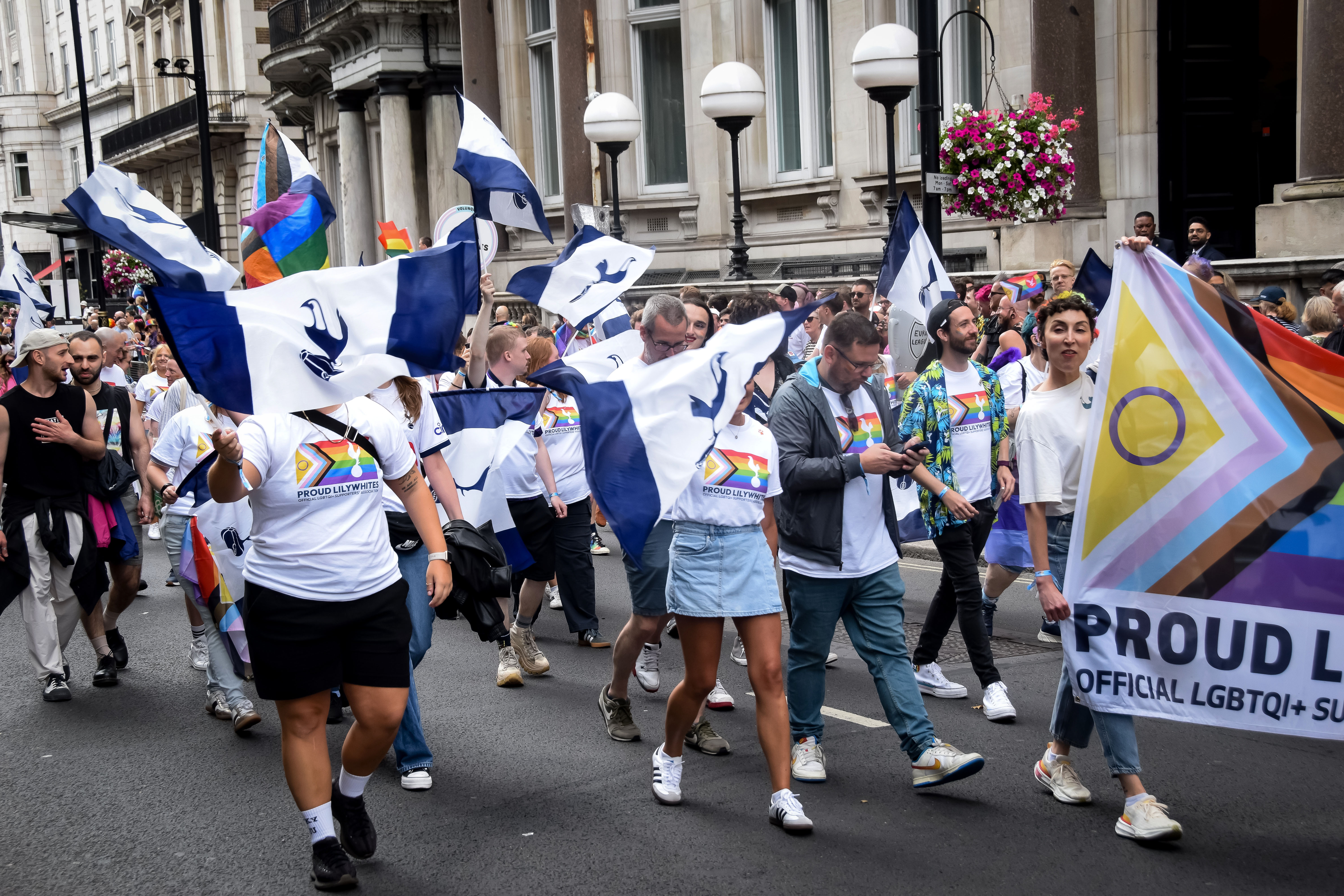
- The Proud Lilywhites marching at Pride in London 2025
- Established: February 2014; 12 years ago
- Co-chair: Chris Paouros
- Parent organization: Tottenham Hotspur F.C.
- Website: proudlilywhites.uk

The Proud Lilywhites are the LGBTQ supporters' group for Tottenham Hotspur F.C., a British association football club. Established in February 2014 with support from the club itself, it is one of the longest-running groups of its kind. the group focuses on social events, campaigning, and education in support of LGBTQ people in football.

== Background ==
In 2013, Chris Paouros was prompted by a friend, who was an Arsenal F.C. supporter, to consider why Arsenal's LGBTQ supporters' group, the Gay Gooners, had no equivalent for Tottenham Hotspur. In response, she asked about this on Twitter and was directed towards the Gay Football Supporters Network (GFSN). When the company Paddy Power's significant involvement in Stonewall's Rainbow Laces dampaign caused Tottenham to reject the campaign as it flouted the club's endorsement agreements, Stonewall instead directed Tottenham to contact GFSN. Paouros was made aware of these developments.

Tottenham expressed a desire to launch an LGBTQ fan group for February 2014, which was to be LGBTQ History Month as well as the Football v Homophobia Month of Action. Between September 2013 and January 2014, the club reached out to its LGBTQ supporters; ten supporters attended a meeting at White Hart Lane with Head of Supporter Services Jonathan Waite. Paouros, one of the attendees, described the club's attitude as them saying, "over to you: you’re our LGBT+ fans, you’re the experts, and we’re happy to facilitate something." This committee, ahead of the launch of the group, helped design the Proud Lilywhites logo as well as create a rainbow flag which would stand at the north-west corner of White Hart Lane's pitch.

== History ==
=== 2014–19: Launch and first years ===
Proud Lilywhites was launched as planned in February 2014. Paouros has stated that their aim was to "put [them]selves out of business" by improving equality in football and changing homophobic attitudes. Tottenham ran a competition under the Proud Lilywhites brand prior to the club's Europa League tie with FC Dnipro which encouraged members to sign up to the new group, rewarding the winning new member with match tickets and a pitch-side photograph with Ledley King. The founder members were allowed to design the group's own formal structure, establishing a focus on socialising, active campaigning, and education. By February 2015, the group had 130 members and group officials had regular contact with Tottenham board members.

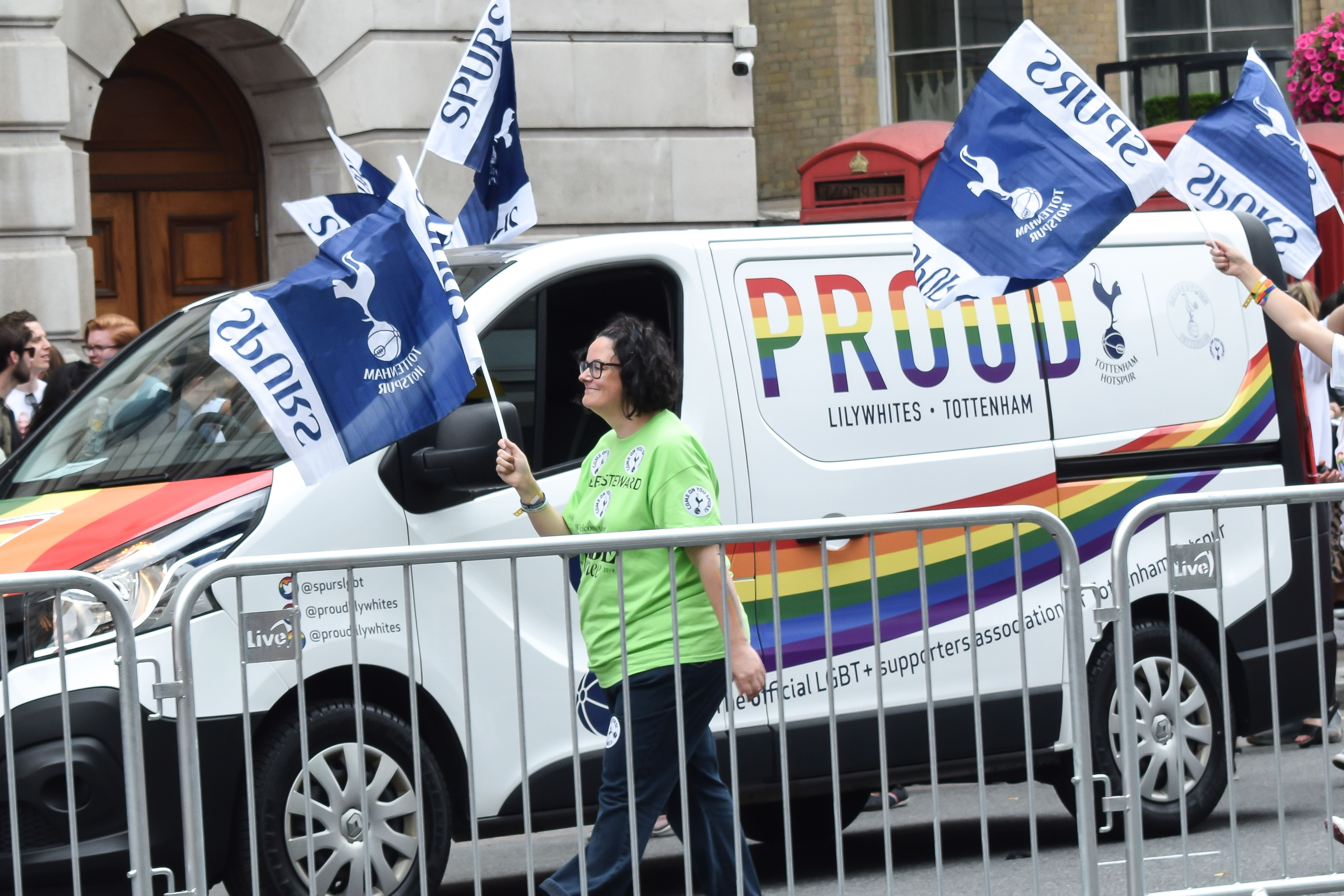
The Proud Lilywhites at Pride in London 2019

During the 2015–16 season, Proud Lilywhites worked with the Tottenham Hotspur Foundation to help teach inclusion modules to teenagers, and helped to raise awareness of LGBTQ issues among match-day stewards. In August 2017, false rumours were spread that Proud Lilywhites were opposed to the transfer of Serge Aurier from Paris Saint-Germain FC due to his past comments. Paouros stated in 2018 that she had "met Serge Aurier twice now, and he’s been lovely."

=== 2020–present: Incident responses ===
On 8 August 2021, Proud Lilywhites unfurled a banner in solidarity with Arsenal midfielder Bukayo Saka and other players after Saka had been subjected to racist abuse following England's defeat to Italy in the Euro 2020 final. The banner read, "North London stands with Bukayo Saka and all players against racism and discrimination. COYS [Come on you Spurs]!".

In 2022, the Crown Prosecution Service defined a chant aimed at Chelsea F.C. players and fans as a homophobic slur. The co-chair of Chelsea F.C.'s LGBTQ supporters group Chelsea Pride, Tracy Brown, thanked members of Proud Lilywhites for collecting "a number of victim impact statements detailing how hearing this chant negatively impacts the experience of football".

In February 2024, men's and women's matches with Wolverhampton Wanderers F.C. and Aston Villa F.C. were dedicated to Proud Lilywhites' 10th anniversary. Tottenham Hotspur Stadium was additionally lit in rainbow colours, and a celebratory event was attended by Ben Davies and Ellie Brazil.

In September 2024, several Tottenham supporters attending the club's Premier League away match against Manchester United F.C. sang anti-gay chants on two occasions, specifically chanting the discriminatory "rent boy" chant at former Chelsea F.C. midfielder Mason Mount in the first half and then singing a chant with a derogatory reference to Arsenal manager Mikel Arteta in the second half. The Football Association charged Tottenham with misconduct for failure to control its supporters. In a disciplinary hearing, Tottenham argued that the commission should take into account its "close work" with Proud Lilywhites. After the Association imposed a £150,000 fine on the club, Tottenham appealed the verdict by stating that its culpability was "low" instead of "medium", with one factor cited again being its work on fan education and steward briefings with Proud Lilywhites. The appeal board reduced the fine to £75,000, referencing the work with Proud Lilywhites as commendable.

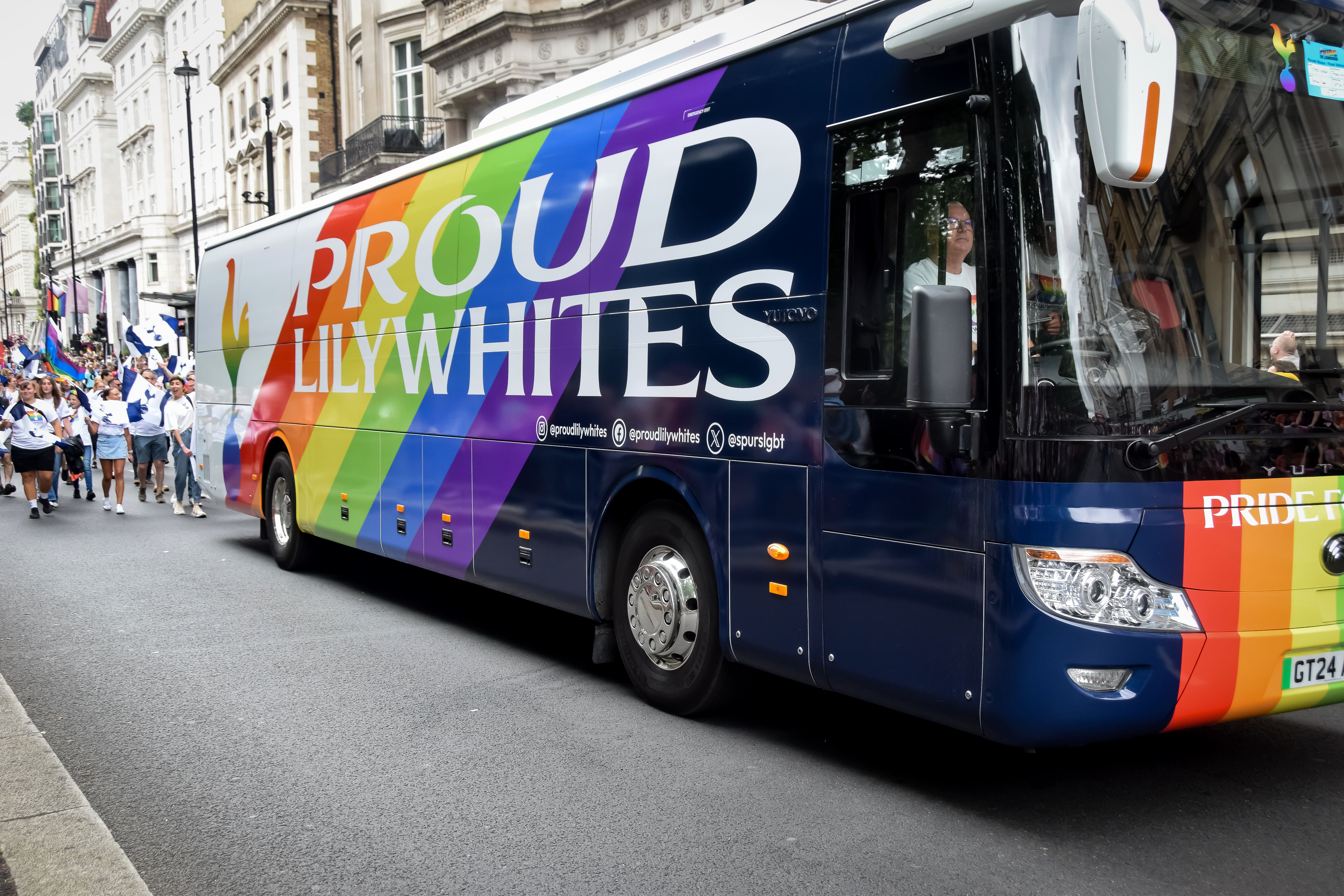
The Proud Lilywhites' bus at Pride in London 2025

After a request from SK Slavia Prague on security grounds in December 2025 prior to a 2025–26 UEFA Champions League match against the club, Tottenham agreed to move the progress flag from the north-east corner of Tottenham Hotspur Stadium, near the away fans, to the south-west corner, close to the home fans. Proud Lilywhites released a statement agreeing that there was a risk of disorder if the flag were not moved, but also stated; "The risk here isn’t the flag. It’s the reaction of a small number of opposition supporters. That’s disappointing, and it’s another reminder of the hostility LGBTQI+ fans still face across European football. We also want to be clear that the club has handled this appropriately." One member of Proud Lilywhites said the move was "a capitulation to people who are scared of LGBT people".

In March 2026, Proud Lilywhites supported Women of the Lane, Tottenham's official women's supporters group, in opposing the appointment of former Marseille manager Roberto de Zerbi as manager of Tottenham due to his support for Mason Greenwood. Greenwood had faced charges of rape and assault which were dropped before he left Manchester United. Proud Lilywhites' statement read, "When someone in that position publicly defends a player like Mason Greenwood, and frames it in a way that downplays the seriousness of what happened, it matters, not just in isolation but in what it signals."
