= David Gwinnutt =

British photographer (born 1961)

David Gwinnutt (born 1961) is a British photographer, artist and designer who was part of London's 1980s club scene. His work is known for its intimate nature, revealing an unseen side to his subjects, which are drawn from London's art world and queer scene. He has photographed amongst others, Quentin Crisp, Derek Jarman, Gilbert and George, Leigh Bowery Edmund White, Maggie Hambling, Rupert Everett and John Schlesinger

== Career ==
The Fine Art Society gave Gwinnutt his first major solo exhibition, The Visitor, in 2000. A mini retrospective of his photographic portraits from the 1980s and 1990s. The exhibition was the cover story for the Saturday Magazine of The Independent.

Many of the world's leading publications have featured Gwinnutt's portraits, including The Independent, Interview Magazine, Vogue, The Face, Le Figaro, The New Yorker, The Guardian, Attitude, Gay Times, Tatler and The Evening Standard.

Twenty one of his portraits are in the collection of the National Portrait Gallery London [1] In 2017 he had his first solo display at The National Portrait Gallery entitled, Before We Were Men

In 1983 he met the painter Patrick Procktor when he went to photograph him and their close friendship lasted until Proctor's death in 2003. Procktor used Gwinnutt as the model for the figures of St John the Baptist and Jesus in his painting for the St John Baptist Chapel in Chichester Cathedral.

In 1985 he was introduced to Edmund White and they became lovers White later penned a portrait of Gwinnutt in his memoir, Inside a Pearl Gwinnutt's intimate portrait of White was used for the paperback cover of Inside a Pearl.

In a desire to diversify from photography and express himself as an artist, Gwinnutt looked to his life-time experience as a gay man and his pride in being British for inspiration. This led him to create the Pink Jack. A simple change to the Union Jack, the Pink Jack has the blue triangle shaped areas, in pink. The pink triangle was a symbol of oppression used by the Nazis to identify homosexuals. It was later reclaimed by gay men as a badge of honour and became a recognised LGBT symbol. Gwinnutt's first experiments with the design were in 1999 but he officially launched it at Europride in London 2006. The design was an instant hit and caught the mood in the UK at the time which was acknowledging equal rights for gay people.

In 2013 he was voted No16 on The Independent Newspaper Pink List of the top 100 most influential gay people in Britain for creating the Pink Jack flag, a twist on the Union Jack, denoting British gay pride. [3] Gwinnutt first launched the Pink Jack flag at Europride, London in 2006 [4]

After photographing gay rights activist Peter Tatchell he began a series of events to raise money for The Peter Tatchell Foundation and was subsequently invited to become a trustee of the Foundation (2013-2017)

In 2017 he published his first book, The White Camera Diaries, which contains many of his 1980's photographs, love letters and the stories behind the images. [5]<ISBN 978-1-5272-1312-8>

In 2018 The Football Association officially sanctioned Gwinnutt's design for a banner for the English LGBT football fans travelling to the World Cup in Russia
