= Embassy of Qatar, London =

Embassy of Qatar in London
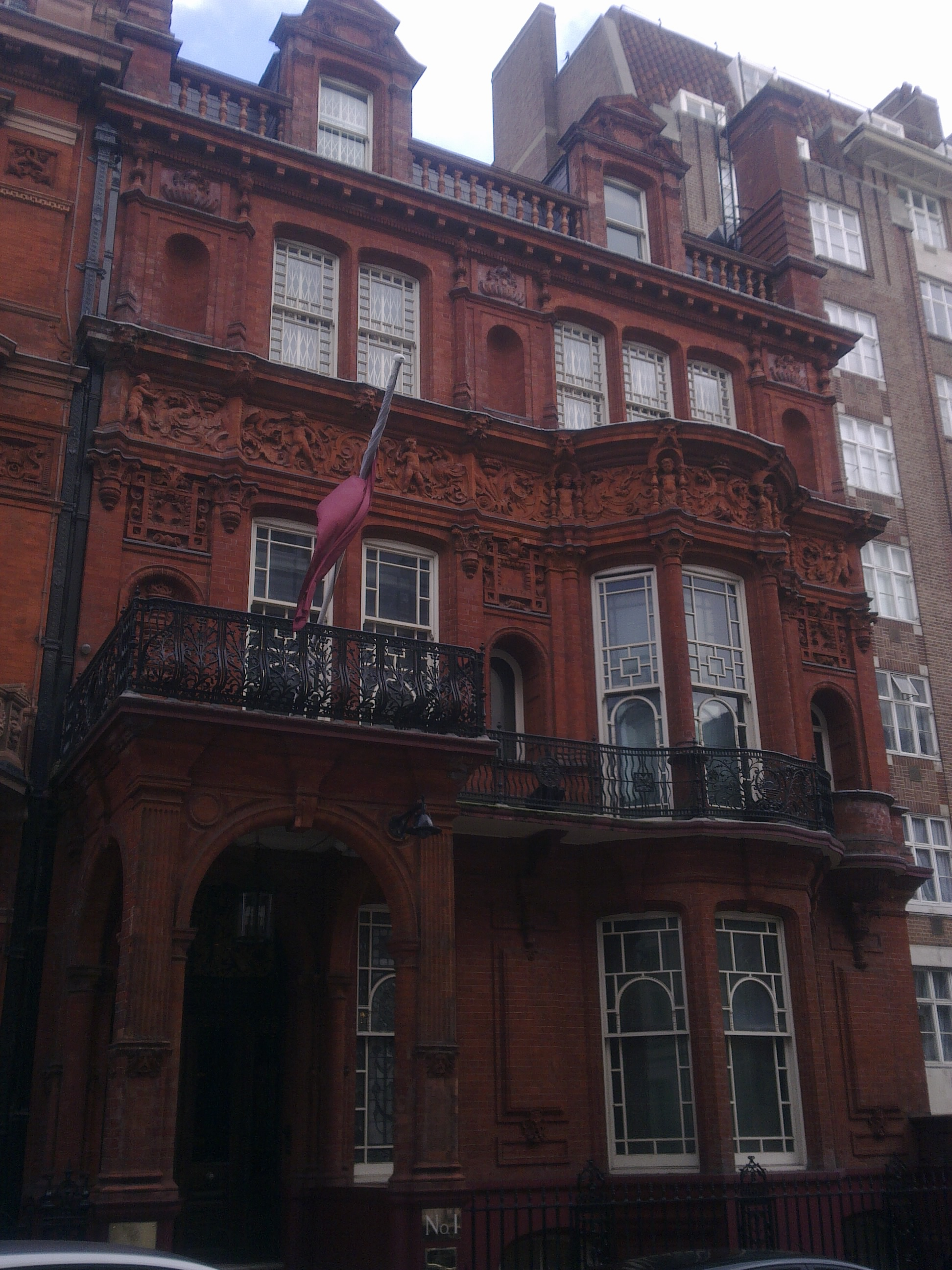
- Location: Mayfair, London
- Address: 1 South Audley Street, London, W1K 1NB
- Coordinates: 51°30′25.1″N 0°9′1.7″W
- Ambassador: Mr. Yousef Ali Al-Khater.

The Embassy of Qatar at 1 South Audley Street in Mayfair, London is the diplomatic mission of Qatar in the United Kingdom. The embassy is housed in a Grade II listed three storey house designed by the architect Frederick Pepys Cockerell and completed after his death by George Aitchison.

The exterior of the house is richly decorated with a terracotta frieze depicting putti.

Qatar also maintains a Cultural and Military Section at 21 Hertford Street, Mayfair and a Health Section at 30 Collingham Gardens, South Kensington.

== Gallery ==
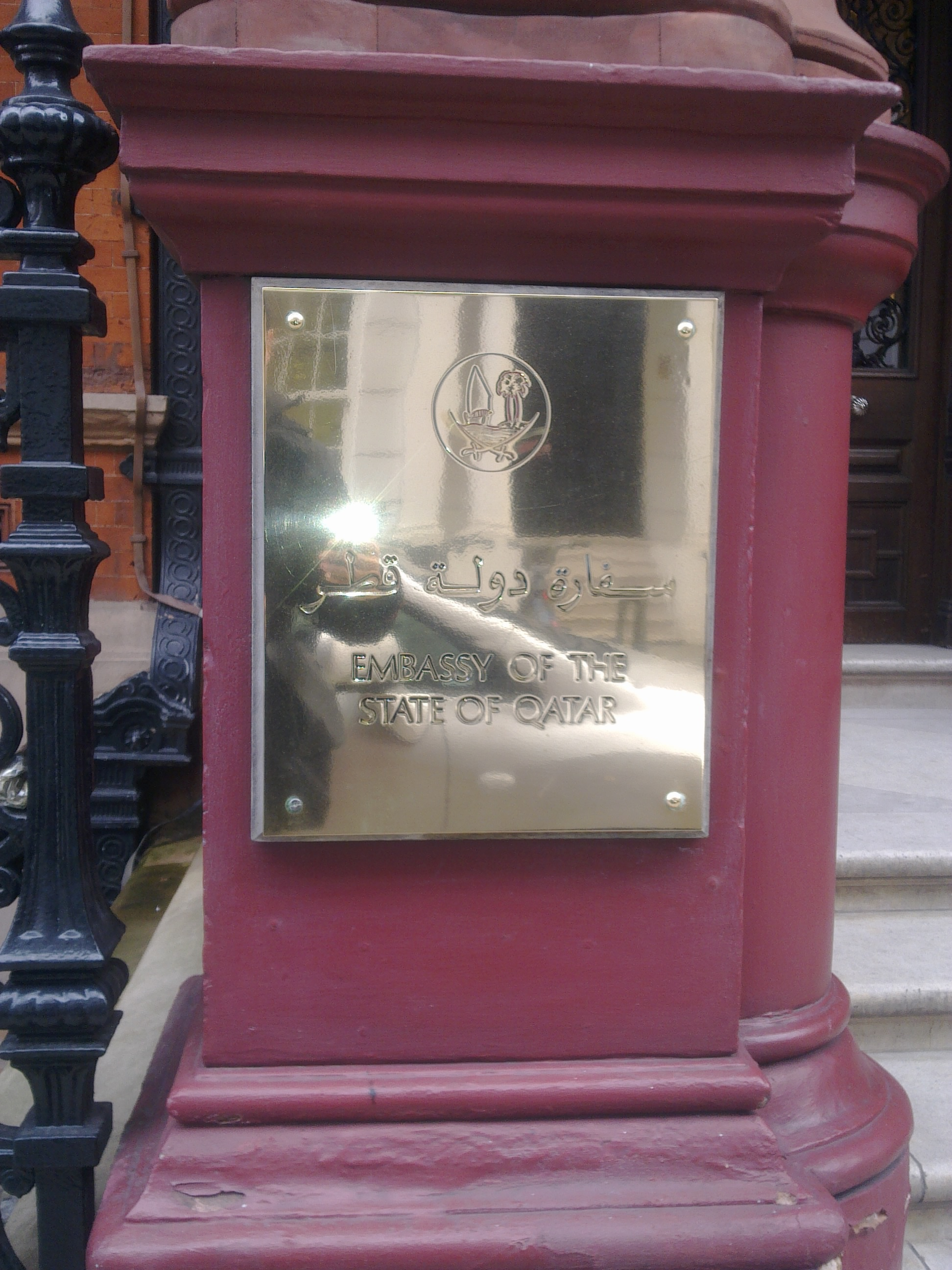
Plaque outside the embassy in Arabic and English depicting the Emblem of Qatar
