= Coat of arms of England =

Royal arms of England

Versions
- Banner of arms, which served as royal banner
- Armiger: Monarchs of England
- Adopted: Late 12th century
- Shield: Gules, three lions passant guardant in pale or armed and langued azure
- Supporters: Various
- Motto: Dieu et mon droit
- Order: Order of the Garter
- Use: First and fourth quarters of current royal coat of arms of the United Kingdom; previously second and third quarters of royal arms of England adopted by Edward III of England, until claim on Kingdom of France relinquished; Unofficial symbol of the nation of England; (with altered tinctures) emblem of various English national sports teams

The coat of arms of England is the coat of arms historically used as arms of dominion by the monarchs of the Kingdom of England, and now used to symbolise England generally. The arms were adopted c.1200 by the Plantagenet kings and continued to be used by successive English and British monarchs; they are currently quartered with the arms of Scotland and Ireland in the coat of arms of the United Kingdom. Historically they were also quartered with the arms of France, representing the English claim to the French throne, and Hanover.

The arms continue to be used in heraldry to represent England, for example in the arms of Canada, although they rarely appear in isolation in royal or government contexts. They have also been adapted by English sporting bodies, forming the basis of the coat of arms of the Football Association, the logo of the England and Wales Cricket Board, England Hockey and England Boxing.

== Description ==
The original royal crest as introduced by Edward III, borne upon a chapeau and with a red mantling lined in ermine. The steel helm has gold embellishments.

The arms have a red background, on which are three gold lions with blue claws and tongues. The lions are depicted striding dexter (heraldic right), with their right front paw raised and their heads turned to face the viewer. The blazon, or formal heraldic description, is Gules, three lions passant guardant in pale Or armed and langued Azure. The lions passant guardant were historically referred to as leopards, but this refers to their pose rather than species.

During the existence of the Kingdom of England the arms were usually depicted as part of a full heraldic achievement, the appearance of which has varied over the centuries.

The first example of a crest on the royal arms was on Edward III's third great seal, which shows a helm above the arms, on which is a crowned gold lion standing upon a chapeau. The design has varied little since, and took on its present form in the reign of Henry VIII.

The chapeau was eventually replaced by a crown, the design of which has varied over time. It was usually shown as an open circlet adorned with fleurs-de-lys or stylised leaves until the reign of Henry VI, when the design was altered to include crosses formy. The crown gained a single arch in reign of Edward IV, and a double arch under Henry VII. Since the late 17th century the crown has consisted of a jewelled circlet with alternating crosses formy and fleurs-de-lys, and two arches with a monde surmounted by a cross formy at their intersection. The shape of the arches of the crown has been represented differently at different times, and can help to date a depiction of the crest.

The helm on which the crest was borne was originally a simple steel design, sometimes with gold embellishments. In the reign of Elizabeth I this was changed to a gold helm with a barred visor, facing the viewer, a design which is restricted to royal arms. At the same time the decorative mantling, which was originally red cloth lined with ermine, was altered to cloth of gold lined with ermine.

Animal supporters first appeared in English heraldry in the 15th century. They were not regarded as an integral part of arms, and were frequently changed. The supporters of many medieval monarchs were invented during the Tudor period but are still used to represent them, for instance at St. George's Chapel, Windsor Castle. The supporters became more consistent under the Tudors, and by the reign of Elizabeth I were usually a red Welsh dragon and a gold lion. After the Union of the Crowns the Stuart monarchs swapped the dragon for a Scottish unicorn, and the lion and unicorn have remained the supporters of the royal arms since.

The English royal arms were often shown encircled by the Order of the Garter, England's highest order of chivalry, a blue circlet bearing the order's Old French motto Honi soit qui mal y pense ("Shame be to him who thinks evil of it"). A motto has also been shown on a scroll under the arms since at least the reign of Henry IV, who used Sovereyne ('Sovereign'). The current motto, Dieu et mon droit ("God and my right"), was first adopted by Henry V, but did not become standardised until 1714.

== History ==
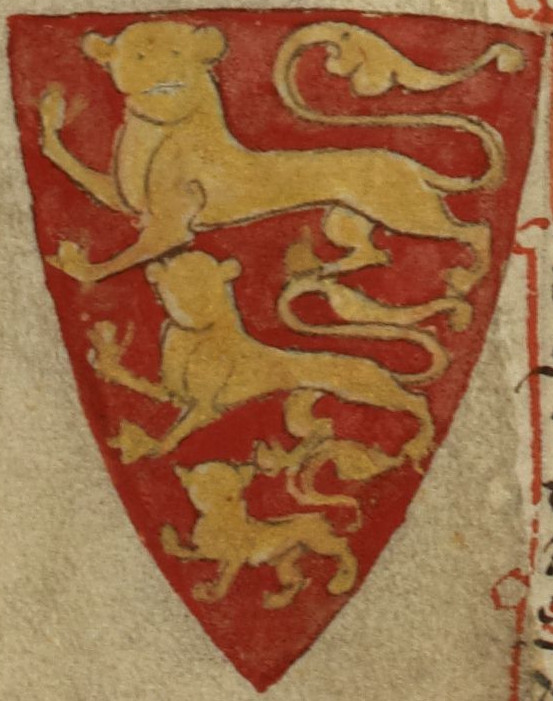
The three lions passants guardants or attributed to William I and his successors Henry I, Stephen, Henry II, John and Henry III by Matthew Paris in Historia Anglorum and Chronica Majora in the 1250s.

Some of the earliest Royal Emblems depicting lions were first used by the Saxons (Lions were adopted in Germanic tradition around the 5th century) and Danes and re-interpreted in a Christian context in the western kingdoms of Gaul and Northern Italy (around the 6th and 7th centuries), as well as by the Normans. Later, during the reign of the Plantagenets (specifically around the end of the 12th century), a formal and consistent English heraldry system emerged.

The blazon of the Plantagenet royal arms is: Gules, three lions passant guardant in pale or armed and langued azure, signifying three identical gold lions (also known as leopards) with blue tongues and claws, walking past but facing the observer, arranged in a column on a red background. Although the tincture azure of tongue and claws is not cited in many blazons, they are historically a distinguishing feature of the arms of England. This coat, designed in the High Middle Ages, has been variously combined with those of the Kings of France, Scotland, a symbol of Ireland, the House of Nassau and the Kingdom of Hanover, according to dynastic and other political changes occurring in England, but has not altered since it took a fixed form in the reign of Richard I of England (1189–1199), the second Plantagenet king.

The earliest surviving representation of an escutcheon, or shield, displaying three lions is that on the Great Seal of King Richard I (1189–1199), which initially displayed one or two lions rampant, but in 1198 was permanently altered to depict three lions passant. Richard's brother John adopted the three lions arms upon his succession, establishing this as the lasting design of the royal arms of England.

The origin and symbolism of the three lions remains unclear. Some suggest they represent Richard I's principal three positions as King of the English, Duke of Normandy, and Duke of Aquitaine. Others note that the arms bear a striking resemblance to both the arms of the Hohenstaufen family, serving as the Dukes of Swabia, and the arms of the kings of Denmark, adopted at nearly the same time. Richard was well acquainted with the Hohenstaufen family: He embarked on the Third Crusade with Frederick I, he fought alongside Frederick VI at Acre, and he was imprisoned by Henry VI; the three lions could demonstrate his personal alliance with them. The three lions would later appear in the arms of the Holy Roman Emperor on the election of Richard's nephew, Otto IV, to the throne.

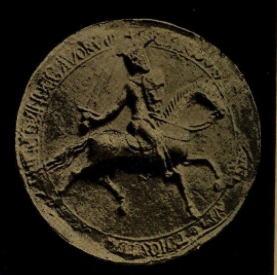
Second seal of Richard I, c.1197-1199, note the three lions passant-guardant upon the shield. The crest of a lion also mounts his enclosed helmet.

Much later antiquarians would retrospectively invent attributed arms for earlier kings, but their reigns pre-dated the systematisation of hereditary English heraldry that only occurred in the second half of the 12th century. Lions may have been used as a badge by members of the Norman dynasty: a late-12th century chronicler reports that in 1128, Henry I of England knighted his son-in-law, Geoffrey Plantagenet, Count of Anjou, and gave him a gold lion badge. The memorial enamel created to decorate Geoffrey's tomb depicts a blue coat of arms bearing gold lions. His youngest son, William FitzEmpress, used an equestrian seal showing a coat with a single lion rampant, while the eldest son, Henry II (1133–1189) used a lion as his emblem, and based on the arms used by his sons and other relatives, he may have used a coat of arms with a single lion or two lions, though no direct testimony of this has been found.

In 1340, following the extinction of the House of Capet, Edward III claimed the French throne. In addition to initiating the Hundred Years' War, Edward III expressed his claim in heraldic form by quartering the royal arms of England with the arms of France. This quartering continued until 1801, with intervals in 1360–1369 and 1420–1422.

=== After the Union of the Crowns ===
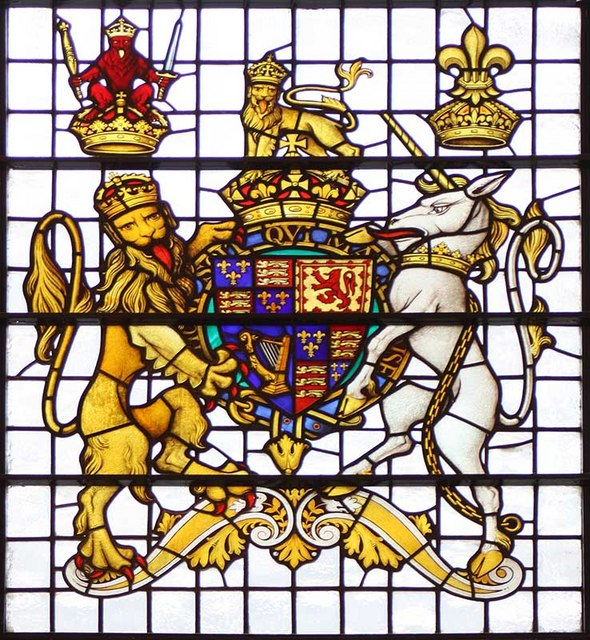
The 17th-century arms depicted in stained glass at St Edmund, King and Martyr, London.

Following the death of Elizabeth I in 1603, the throne of England was inherited by the Scottish House of Stuart, resulting in the Union of the Crowns: the Kingdom of England and Kingdom of Scotland were united in a personal union under James VI and I. As a consequence, the royal arms of England and Scotland were combined in the king's new personal arms. Nevertheless, although referencing the personal union with Scotland and Ireland, the royal arms of England remained distinct from the royal arms of Scotland, when the countries finally united in 1707, the English style of arms became the basis for the coat of arms of Great Britain, while Scotland retained its distinct arms.

=== After the formation of Great Britain ===
On 1 May 1707 the kingdoms of England and Scotland were merged to form that of Great Britain; to symbolise this their arms were impaled in the first and fourth quarters of the royal arms. The claim to the French throne continued, albeit passively, until it was mooted by the French Revolution and the formation of the French First Republic in 1792. The Acts of Union 1800 united the Kingdom of Great Britain with the Kingdom of Ireland to form the United Kingdom of Great Britain and Ireland. Under King George III of the United Kingdom, a proclamation of 1 January 1801 set the royal style and titles and modified the royal arms, removing the French quarter and putting the arms of England, Scotland and Ireland on the same structural level, with the dynastic arms of Hanover moved to an inescutcheon.

=== Development ===
Kingdom of England (Under personal union with the Kingdom of Scotland from 1603 to 1707)
Escutcheon	Period	Description
	1189–1198	The arms of Richard I are only known from two armorial seals, and hence the tinctures can not be determined. His First Great Seal showed one lion on half of the shield. It is debated whether this was meant to represent two lions combatant or a single lion, and if the latter, whether the direction in which the lion is facing is relevant or simply an artistic liberty. A simple lion rampant is most likely.
	1198–1340; 1360–1369	The arms on the second Great Seal of Richard I, used by his successors until 1340: Gules, three lions passant guardant in pale or.
	1340–1360; 1369–1395; 1399–1406	Edward III adopted the arms of France Azure semé de lis or (powdering of fleurs-de-lis on a blue field) – representing his claim to the French throne - and quartered the royal arms of England but with the French fleurs-de-lis in the dominant 1st and 4th quarters, thereby acknowledging the seniority of France as a kingdom. This situation remained until 1801 when George III renounced the English claim to the French throne and the lilies were then removed.
	1395–1399	Richard II adopted the attributed arms of King Edward the Confessor and impaling the royal arms of England, denoting a mystical union.
	1406–1554	Henry IV abandoned the attributed arms of King Edward the Confessor, and reduced the fleurs-de-lis to three, in imitation of Charles V of France.
	1554–1558	Mary I and Philip impaled their arms. Philip's arms were: A. arms quarterly Castile and Leon, B. per pale Aragon and Aragon-Sicily, the whole enté en point Granada; in base quarterly Austria, Burgundy ancient, Burgundy modern and Brabant, with an escutcheon (in the nombril point) per pale Flanders and Tyrol. Although Queen Mary I's father, King Henry VIII, assumed the title of King of Ireland and this was further conferred upon King Philip, the arms were not altered to feature the Kingdom of Ireland.: As sovereigns of Milan, Mary and Philip added an escutcheon of the Duchy of Milan used since the time of the Sforza: It presented the Biscione, an azure serpent in the act of consuming a human, showing in argent and quartering with the Imperial eagle (the earlier single-headed) on a shield or. The order in what are shown the English and French arms on English quarters is altered respect the usual, retaining the claimed French fleurs-de-lis as the dominant only in the royal arms of England.
	1558–1603	Elizabeth I restored the arms of Henry IV.
	1603–1649; 1660–1689	James I inherited the English throne in 1603, establishing a union with Scotland, and quartered the royal arms of England with those of Scotland. The royal arms of Ireland was added to represent the Kingdom of Ireland. Last used by Anne, this was the final version of the royal arms of England before being subsumed into the royal arms of Great Britain.
	1689–1694	James II was deposed and replaced with his daughter Mary II and son-in-law and nephew William III. As co-monarchs, they impaled their arms, with the husband's arms taking the dexter half of greatest honour, as heraldic custom dictates. William bore the royal arms with the addition of an inescutcheon of Nassau (the royal house to which William belonged): Azure billetty or, a lion rampant of the last armed and langued gules, while Mary bore the royal arms undifferenced.
	1694–1702	After the death of Mary II, William III reigned alone, and used his arms only.
	1702–1707	Anne inherited the throne upon the death of William III, and the royal arms returned to the 1603 version. She was the last monarch of an independent Kingdom of England and the first monarch of Great Britain.

== Royal banner of England ==
The royal arms of England featuring as the royal banner

When the royal arms take the form of a heraldic flag, it is variously known as the Royal Banner of England, the Banner of the Royal Arms, the Banner of the King (Queen) of England, or by the misnomer the Royal Standard of England. (Note: In A Complete Guide to Heraldry (1909), Arthur Charles Fox-Davies explains: It is a misnomer to term the banner of the Royal Arms the Royal Standard. The term standard properly refers to the long tapering flag used in battle, by which an overlord mustered his retainers in battle. The archaeologist and antiquarian Charles Boutell also makes this distinction.) This royal banner differs from England's national flag, the Saint George's Cross, in that it does not represent any particular area or land, but rather symbolises the sovereignty vested in the rulers thereof.

The royal banner of England is the English banner of arms and so has always borne the royal arms of England—the personal arms of England's reigning monarch. When displayed in war or battle, this banner signalled that the sovereign was present in person. Because the royal banner depicted the royal arms of England, its design and composition changed throughout the Middle Ages. It is variously known as the royal banner of England, the banner of the royal arms, the banner of the king of England, or by the misnomer of the royal standard of England; Arthur Charles Fox-Davies explains that it is "a misnomer to term the banner of the royal arms the Royal Standard", because "the term standard properly refers to the long tapering flag used in battle, by which an overlord mustered his retainers in battle". The archaeologist and antiquarian Charles Boutell also makes this distinction.

== Contemporary use ==
=== Royal heraldry ===
Duchy of Lancaster arms

As the arms of England have been superseded by the arms of the United Kingdom the former are rarely seen alone in contemporary contexts. One exception is the Duchy of Lancaster, the monarch's private estate, which uses the arms of England differenced by a 'label of France', i.e. a blue label of three points with three fleurs-de-lys in each. These arms originated with Edmund Crouchback, the second son of Henry III, whose descendants were created dukes of Lancaster. The duchy merged with the Crown when Henry Bolingbroke became king in 1399.

The arms also make a standalone appearance at coronations, when banners of the individual quarterings of the royal arms are processed through Westminster Abbey.

=== Non-royal heraldry ===
==== Local government ====
Several English towns display adapted versions of the arms of England, often derived from seals which showed the full arms. The most common alterations are to change the tinctures (colours); Dorset County Council, for example, uses a silver field and red lions, and Hereford a red field with silver lions. Several such arms are associated with the Cinque Ports, a confederation of historic ports in southeast England whose arms are those of England dimidiated with three ships' hulls on a blue field.

The arms of Berkshire County Council bore arms with two golden lions, referencing the attributed arms of the Norman kings and their early influence upon the county.

A single gold lion, on a red chief, appears on the coats of arms of Canterbury and Chichester. Outside of England, it also appears on the coats of arms of the Canadian provinces of New Brunswick and Prince Edward Island, reflecting their heritage.

==== Corporate ====
The arms of England are used by several institutions, often founded by or with a link to the monarchy. Westminster Abbey, for example, includes the fifteenth century version of the arms in its own achievement. At Oxford University, Oriel College uses the royal arms with a border to symbolise that it was founded by Edward II, while at Cambridge University the arms of Christ's College, St John's College, and St Edmund's College include the arms as they were founded by descendants of the royal family.

==== Personal ====
Several families are entitled to use the English arms, usually differenced in some way. This most often occurred through descent from a member of the royal family (e.g. the dukes of Norfolk, descended from Thomas of Brotherton, fifth son of Edward I), or from an illegitimate child of the monarch being granted a version of the royal arms (e.g. the dukes of Richmond, descended from Charles Lennox, illegitimate son of Charles II).

Local government, corporate, and personal arms incorporating the royal arms

Hastings Borough Council

Oriel College, Oxford

Henry Somerset, 12th duke of Beaufort

=== Other uses ===
The English arms, and the three lions passant alone, have become one of the national symbols of England. The three lions have been extensively used in sport, and currently feature in the coats of arms of The Football Association, the England and Wales Cricket Board, and in the logo of England Boxing. In 1997 and 2002 the Royal Mint issued a one pound coin featuring three lions passant to represent England. The arms have also featured on Royal Mail postage stamps, such as a 2001 issue to celebrate St George's Day which featured the three lions on second-class stamps.

Contemporary uses of the royal arms

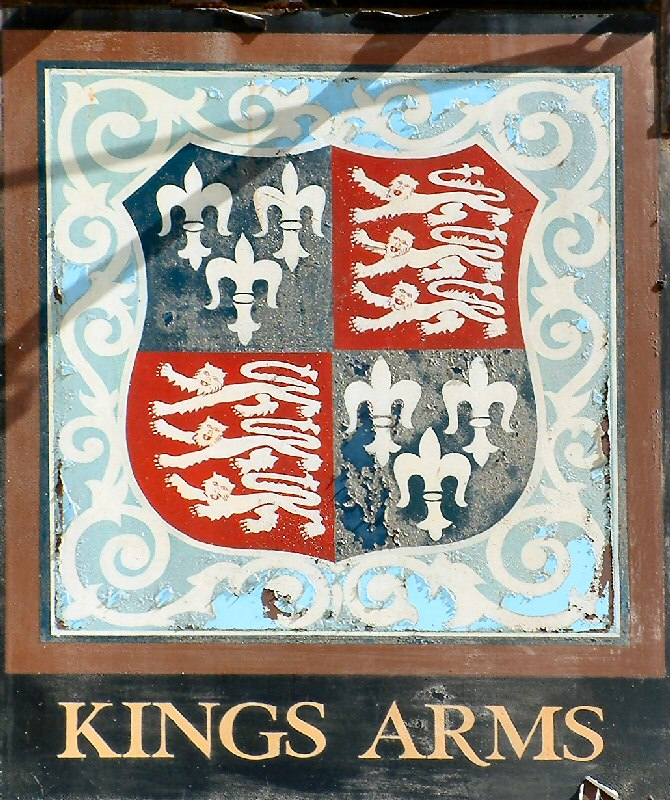
The royal arms of England as depicted on the Kings Arms pub in Blakeney, Norfolk

A British one pound (£1) coin, issued in 1997, featuring three lions passant, representing England

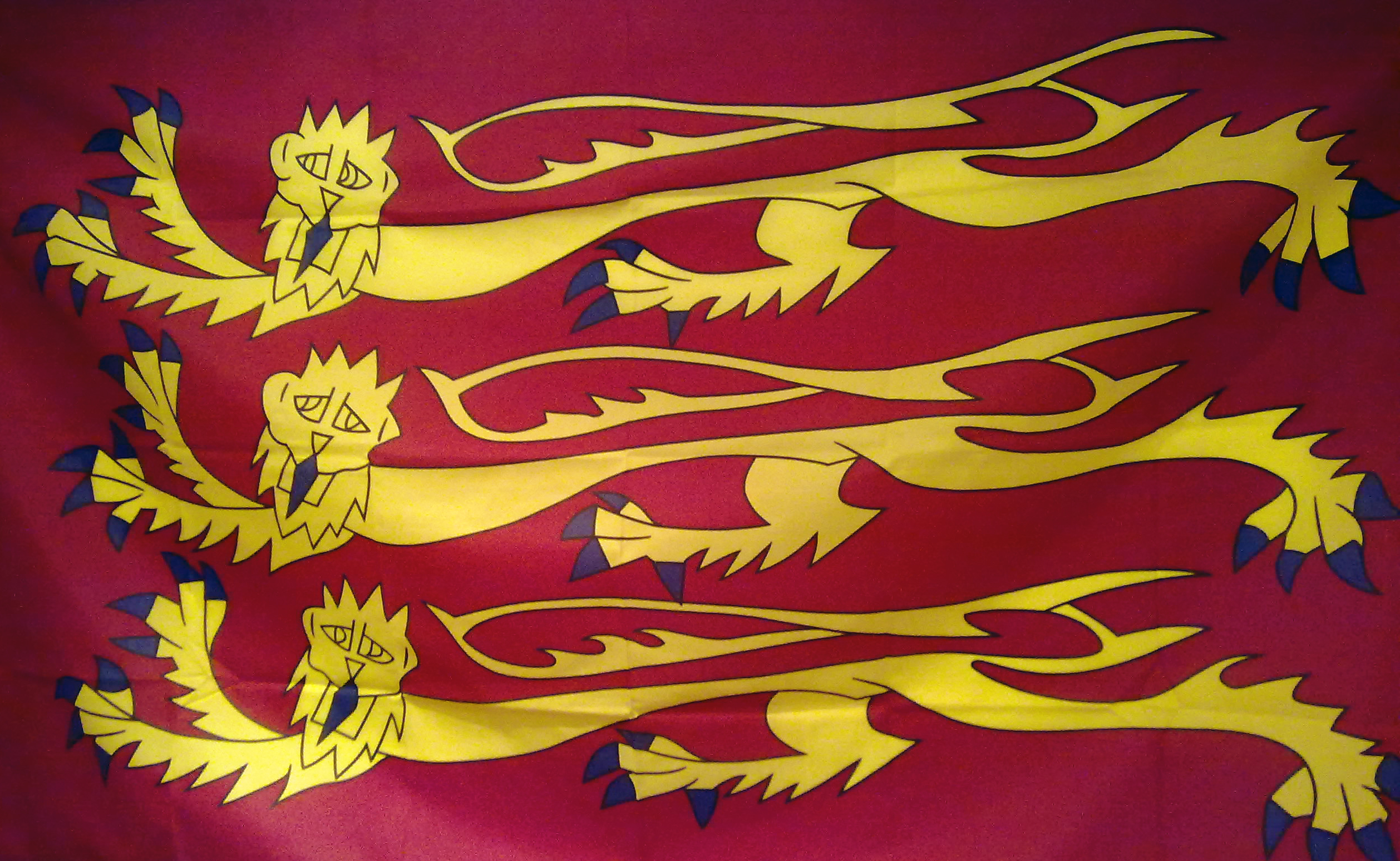
A modern, commercially available royal banner of England, printed on polyester fabric

The arms worn by England cricket team. The national football team removed the original crown to distinguish it from the cricket team in 1949.

== See also ==
- Flag of England
- Royal badges of England
- Coat of arms of Scotland
- Coat of arms of Great Britain
- Coat of arms of the United Kingdom
- Armorial of the House of Plantagenet
