= Coat of arms of the Football Association =

- The heraldic achievement granted on 9 January 1979

Versions
- Coat of arms granted on 30 March 1949 and currently used by the FA

- The crest of the England national football team consists of the FA arms and a star

The Football Association, the governing body of association football in England, was granted a coat of arms on 30 March 1949. This was similar to the royal arms of England and features three blue lions on a white background, together with ten Tudor roses. On 9 January 1979 the association received a second grant of arms, expanding the coat of arms to a full heraldic achievement by adding a crest, supporters and motto. This grant also gave the association the right to use a separate heraldic badge, based on the FA Cup trophy. The association continues to use the earlier coat of arms and there is no evidence that the full heraldic achievement has even been used.

== First grant of arms ==
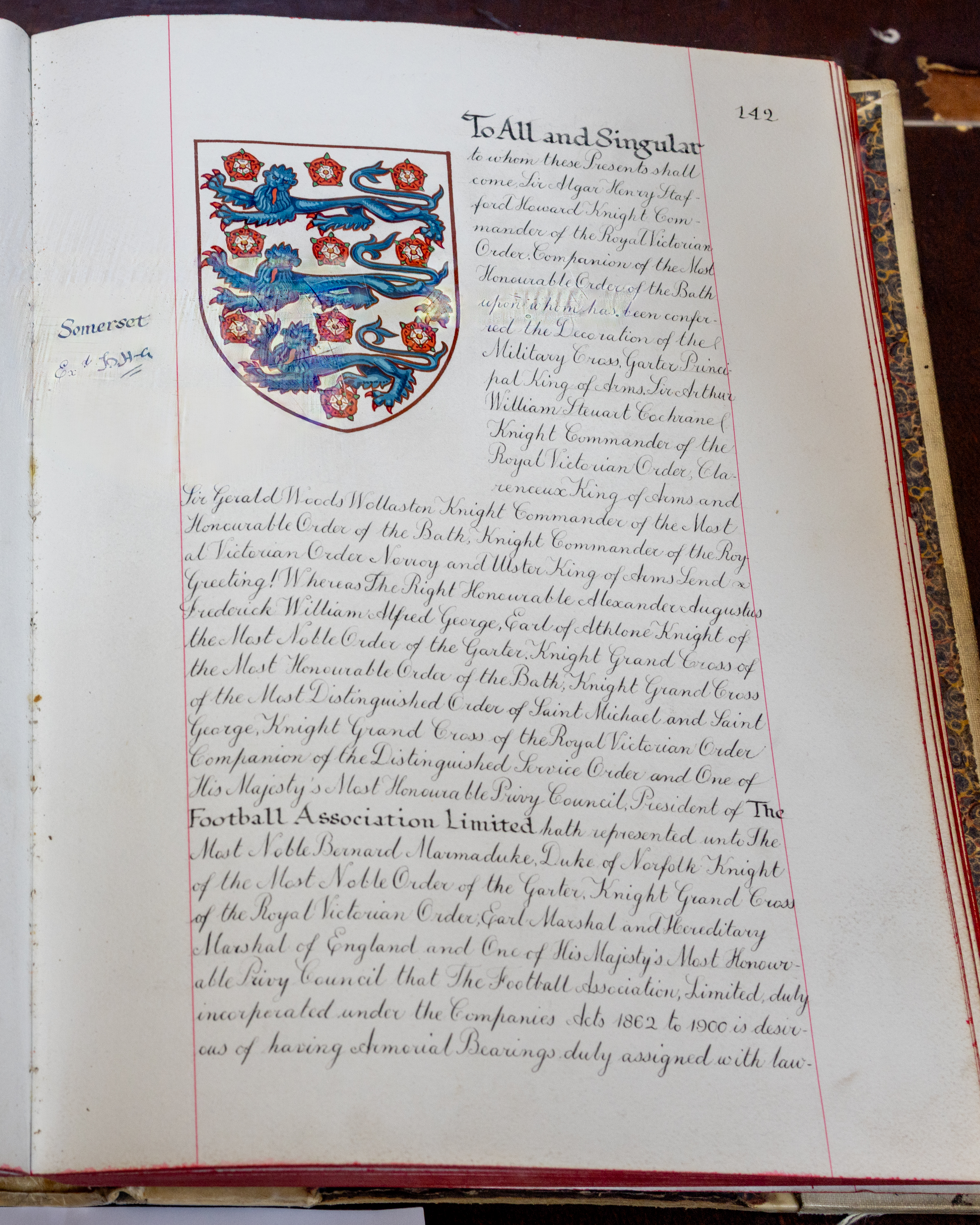
The first grant of arms, held at the College of Arms

The Football Association (FA) was founded in 1863. At first, its influence on the game of association football was limited but the first FA Cup competition in 1871 changed things and by the end of the century the organisation was generally recognised as the national body for the sport. The association now manages the men's, women's and youth national teams.

In its early years the FA used various symbols on its products, for example medals, including the royal arms of England and the royal arms of the United Kingdom. By the late 19th century the FA was using a distinctive badge on the shirts of the England men's national team. This was three blue lions on a white field (properly described as Argent three lions passant guardant in pale azure) and was sometimes depicted with a crown above (royally crowned). This was similar to the royal arms of England which show three yellow lions on a red background.

The FA petitioned the College of Arms for its own coat of arms, which were granted on 30 March 1949. These were based on the unofficial form used previously, though ten Tudor roses were added between the lions. The coat's formal description is Argent semy of Tudor roses three lions passant guardant in pale azure. The reason for the use of 10 roses is not known; it has been suggested that 11 roses would be more suitable, representing the number of players in a football team. Some have queried whether the officials at the College of Arms were unfamiliar with the game or if the roses were intended to represent the 10 regional divisions in the FA at the time of award.

The 1949 coat of arms was combined with the Jules Rimet trophy, a football-globe and a Union Flag, to create the official insignia for the 1966 World Cup, hosted by England.

== Second grant of arms ==
On 9 January 1979 the FA received a second grant of arms, expanding their original coat of arms into a full heraldic achievement by the addition of a crest, supporters and motto. The crest was a blue cap of maintenance, upon which was perched a peregrine falcon holding a Tudor rose stem in its mouth (On a cap of maintenance azure turned up argent a peregrine falcon rising belled and jessed holding in the beak an English wild rose slipped and leaved all proper.). The supporters were lions with their upper halves white and lower halves blue (replicating the England football kit colours). The lions were depicted standing, each with a foot rested on a football and a Tudor rose on their shoulder (On each side a lion party per fess argent and azure charged on the shoulder with a Tudor rose and with the interior hindfoot resting on a football proper.). The motto, below the coat of arms, is "Play the game". In addition to the achievement the grant awarded the FA a separate heraldic badge, depicting the FA Cup in a wreath of olive leaves (A representation of the Football Association Cup encircled by a chaplet of olive leaves proper). There is no evidence that the FA made use of the full heraldic achievement or badge and correspondence between The Heraldry Society and the FA indicates that the latter were unaware they were entitled to use them and could not locate copies of either of their grants of arms.

== Modern use ==
Because of their use on national team football shirts and other FA products the coat of arms is familiar to many English people. The Heraldry Society have said that "it is probable that, after the Royal arms, it is the most widely recognised shield in England". The coat is the subject of the England football song "Three Lions".

The coat of arms has been trademarked by the Football Association. They were central to a 1997 court case by the FA against sweet manufacturer Trebor Bassett who had used photographs of England players, wearing shirts bearing the arms, on cards given away with packets of candy sticks. The court found in favour of Trebor Bassett, determining that the use of the trademark was incidental and not deemed to be "affixed" to the product under the terms of the Trade Marks Act 1994.
