= Amal Fashanu =

British journalist and activist

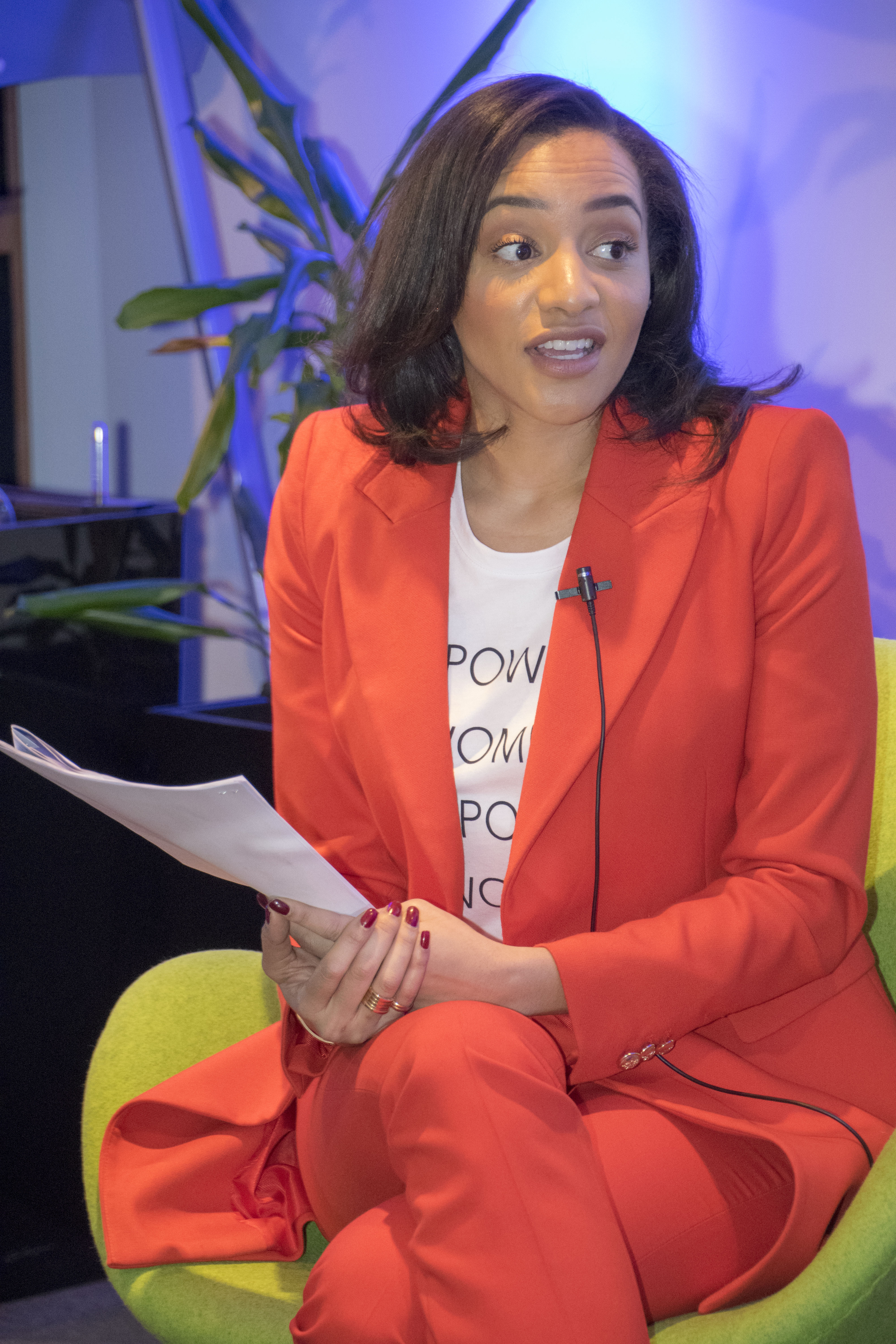
- Fashanu in 2018
- Born: 21 August 1988 (age 38); City of Westminster, London, England
- Education: Runnymede College; Brunel University; Instituto Europeo de Diseño
- Occupations: Fashion designer; filmmaker; journalist
- Parents: John Fashanu (father); Marisol Acuña Duenas (mother)
- Relatives: Justin Fashanu (uncle)

Amal Fashanu (born 21 August 1988) is a British fashion designer, filmmaker, journalist, and activist against homophobia in sport. She produced Britain's Gay Footballers, a BBC Three documentary. She is the founder and CEO of the Justin Fashanu Foundation, as well as Black Heart Label and Amal Fashanu Handbags.

== Biography ==
Amal Fashanu was born 21 August 1988 at Portland Hospital, in the City of Westminster, London, and is the daughter of John Fashanu, an English footballer, and Marisol Acuña Duenas, a Spanish model. She attended St Christina's School in London, before moving to Madrid in 1999 to study at Runnymede College. In 2006 she began her studies at Brunel University in London, receiving a BASc in Communications and Media Studies. Fashanu studied handbag design at the Instituto Europeo de Diseño in Madrid.

In 2012, Fashanu's BBC Three Documentary Britain's Gay Footballers was released. Following the suicide of her uncle Justin Fashanu, Britain's first black £1m footballer who was also openly gay, the film explored homophobia and discrimination within the football world. The documentary was nominated for a British Broadcasting Award in 2013.

Her second documentary The Batman Shootings (2012) covered the massacre in a US cinema in which 12 people were killed by a lone shooter whilst watching The Dark Knight Rises. Her third, Find A Home For My Brother (2015) explored the care provisions that are in place for young people with learning disabilities in the UK and Ghana.

In 2012, Fashanu was invited by David Cameron, who was then the Prime Minister of the United Kingdom, to a summit on discrimination in football at Downing Street. She created the fashion line Black Heart Label, the first brand of the label, Fash and U, was inspired by her uncle Justin Fashanu.

After studying handbag design at the Instituto Europeo de Diseño, Fashanu created Amal Fashanu Handbags.

Fashanu works as a journalist and has reported for BBC News, BBC Radio, talkSPORT, Sky News, Sky Sport, The Huffington Post and The Guardian.

Fashanu and her father set up the Justin Fashanu Foundation to eliminate prejudice and tackle homophobia in sport.

On June 1, 2022, Fashanu released her debut single titled "Detty December" in preparation of a four-track extended play (EP) titled New Beginnings that was intended to be released in September the same year.

On Valentine's Day 2025, Fashanu released her debut EP, titled Unreleased Letters to My Ex.

On June 9, 2026, The Nigerian Police Force invited both John Fashanu and his wife, Vivian Fashanu, to answer to another string of allegations in a petition by Amal Fashanu. The family alleges that Amal is instigating a battle to surreptitiously take control of John and his wife's livelihood and resources against their wishes.
