= Rainbow Laces =

British LGBTQ sporting campaign

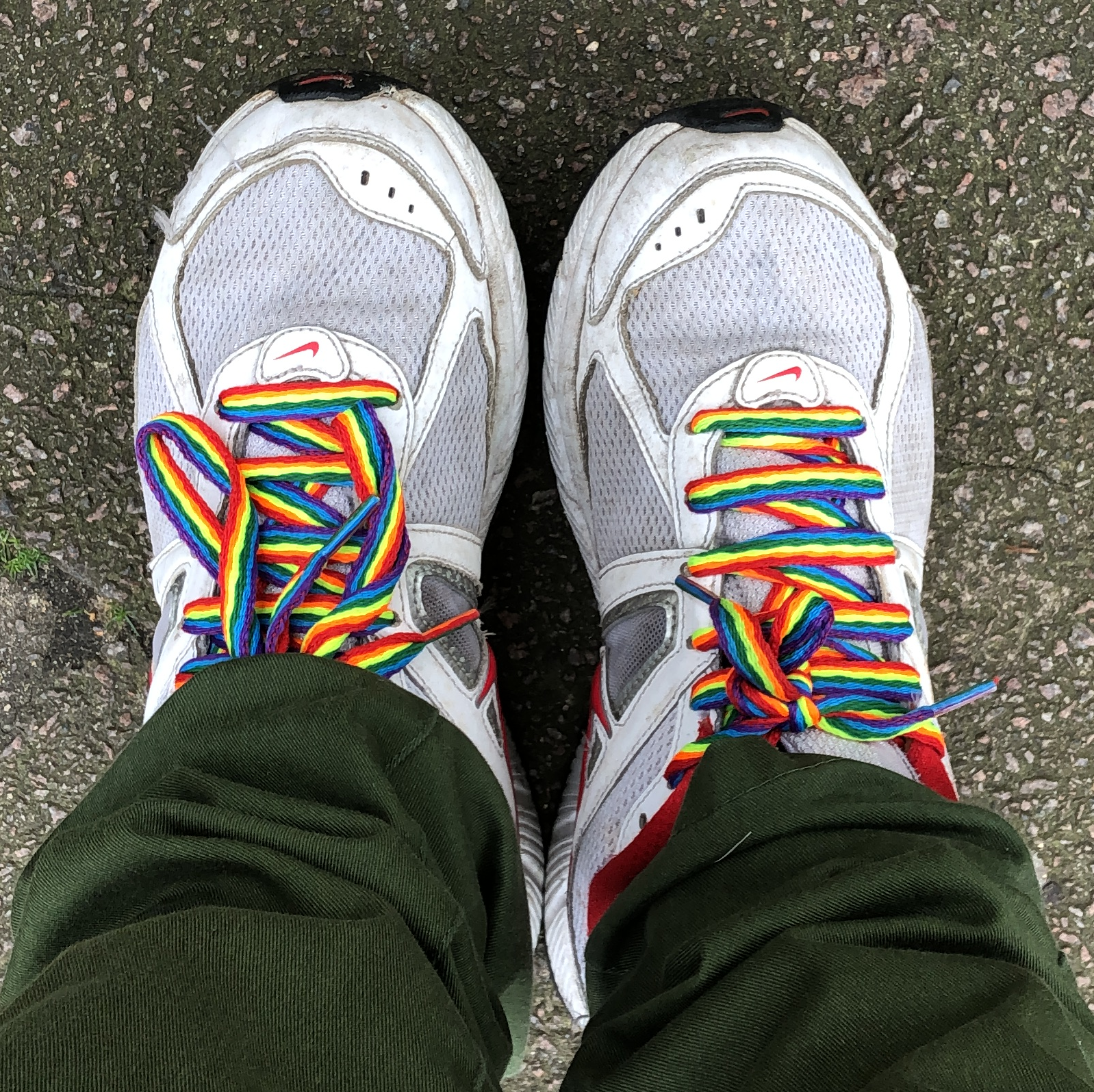
The campaign encouraged people to wear rainbow laces in support of LGBTQ people in sports

Rainbow Laces is a campaign by the LGBTQ charity Stonewall in support of LGBTQ people in British association football. On a yearly basis, players were encouraged to show their support by wearing rainbow shoelaces provided by Stonewall. It began in September 2013 as part of a one-off initiative named Right Behind Gay Footballers, headed by Stonewall backed by bookmaking company Paddy Power. Since January 2026, the campaign has widened in focus to cover all sports over a more consistent and long-term time frame.

== History ==
=== 2013: Right Behind Gay Footballers ===
In September 2013, the Right Behind Gay Footballers campaign, a collaboration between the LGBTQ charity Stonewall and the bookmaking company Paddy Power, sent sets of laces to all 92 Premier League and English Football League (EFL) clubs, and to the 42 teams in the Scottish Professional Football League. The campaign asked the footballers in these clubs to wear the laces during matches on the weekend of 21–22 September. This was accompanied with a billboard campaign, Crispin Porter & Bogusky and Lucky Generals were the creative agencies behind the campaign. Lines involved in the advertisements included, "Over 5,000 footballers and none of them are gay. What are the odds on that?" and, "We don't care which team you play for."

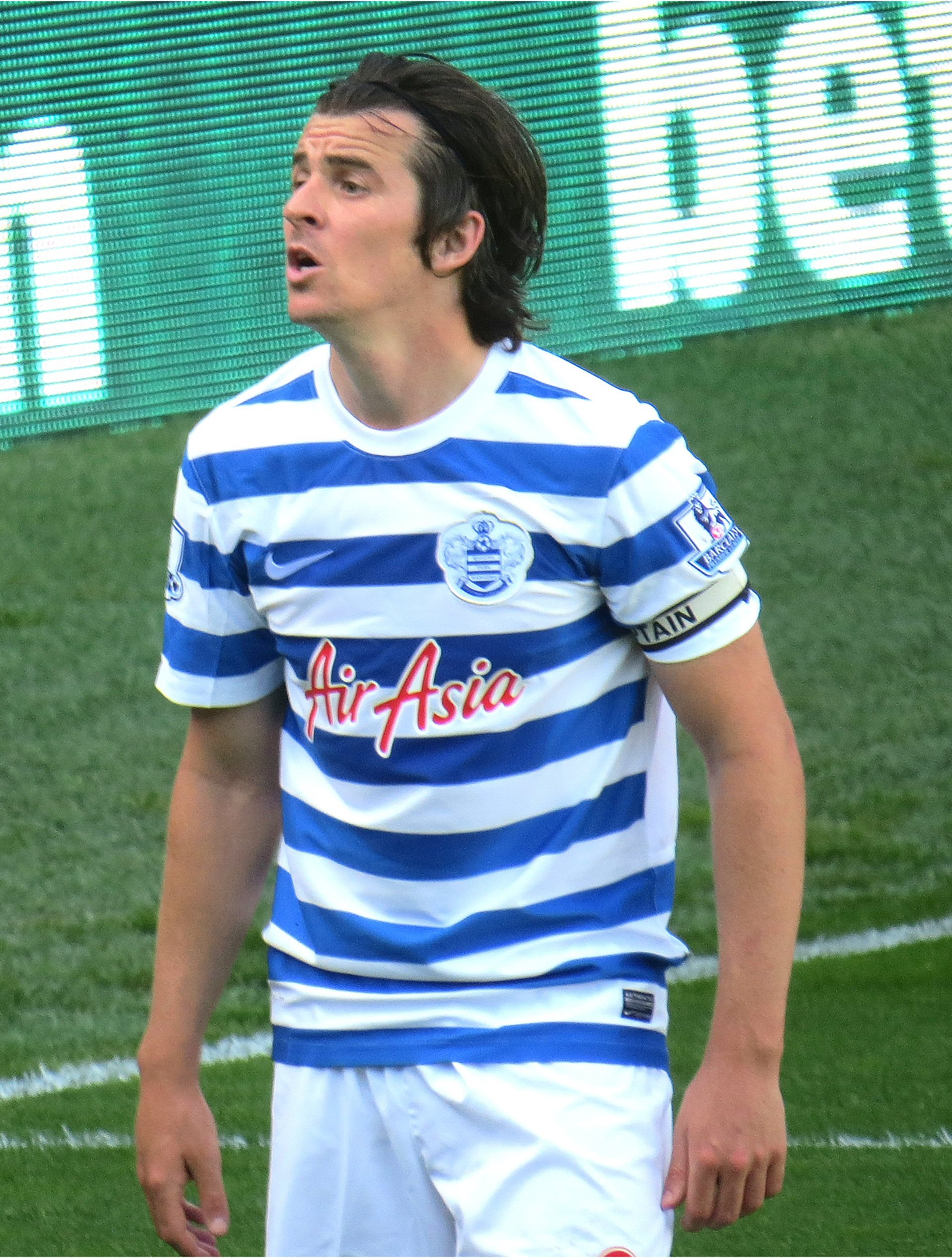
Joey Barton (pictured 2015) was an early vocal supporter of the initial 2013 campaign, Right Behind Gay Footballers

The campaign had a small amount of success in encouraging players to wear the laces; Everton stated that some of its players would wear the laces. Joey Barton, midfielder for Queens Park Rangers F.C., was an early supporter of the campaign, tweeting a call to action; "Show that people's sexuality shouldn't be an issue. Join the rainbow laces movement." Due to a perceived lack of consultation with the clubs or Premier League on the part of Paddy Power and Stonewall as well as partnership conflicts, some football clubs chose not to wear the laces including Manchester United, Tottenham Hotspur and Norwich City. All three clubs emphasised their support for the general cause, with Tottenham noting its work with Kick It Out. Norwich in particular already had a relationship with SBOBet which a Paddy Power partnership would have jeopardised. Days after the campaign's launch, the anti-homophobia group Football v Homophobia (FvH) criticised the language used for Right Behind Gay Footballers, stating that the messages used in the campaign relied on "sexualised innuendo and stereotypes about gay men", and thus reinforced homophobia in football. Some football authorities had a mixed reception to the campaign.

=== 2014–16: First Rainbow Laces campaigns ===
The campaign was given the go-ahead for the 2014–15 season in September 2014, again as a collaboration between Stonewall and Paddy Power but this time under the Rainbow Laces moniker. Over 100,000 pairs of coloured laces were distributed for that year's campaign. Individuals who pledged to wear the laces included Barton, Arsenal captain Mikel Arteta, and the new England midfielder Fabian Delph, as well as former professionals Michael Owen and Thomas Hitzlsperger who had announced he was gay after retiring in 2013. Arsenal released a short video to promote Rainbow Laces which featured its players Theo Walcott, Olivier Giroud, Arteta, Santi Cazorla and Alex Oxlade-Chamberlain. The tabloid newspaper Metro devoted a full issue to supporting Rainbow Laces; it featured specially-made ads with gay-friendly messages from companies such as Smirnoff, Direct Booking and Premier Inn, with the latter jokingly changing its name to Premier Out.

In 2016, sports stars in Australia wore rainbow-coloured laces for the weekend of 2–3 April in a move inspired by the Rainbow Laces campaign in Britain as well as other campaigns. Over 100,000 pairs of laces were distributed, and football, rugby union, rugby league, Australian rules football, and netball players took part including David Pocock and Matt To'omua, the latter of whom helped launch the Australian campaign. For the 2016 Rainbow Laces campaign itself, the companies Aon, Adidas and Aviva supported the relaunch, as did executive chairman of the Premier League, Richard Scudamore. For the Rainbow Laces weekend on 26–27 November, Premier League branding was set to include a rainbow motif which would be used across perimeter hoardings at stadiums and on social media. Manchester United and Manchester City supported that year's campaign.

=== 2017–25: Expansion in scope ===
In 2017, the coalition of organisations supporting Rainbow Laces, including Adidas, Manchester United, O2, Sky Sports and Visa, was named Team Pride. The 2017 Rainbow Laces campaign expanded in length, lasting from November 24 to December 3. It also expanded in scope; the Premier League, EFL, Scottish Professional Football League (SPFL), England Rugby, Premiership Rugby, the England and Wales Cricket Board (ECB), the British Olympic Association, British Cycling, England Hockey, Great Britain Wheelchair Rugby, the Rugby Football League, the Scottish PFA, UK Athletics, the Football Association of Wales, the British Basketball League, and the Welsh Rugby Union all showed their support. Nearly 200,000 pairs of laces were sold. The EFL announced that rainbow flags would feature as the corner flags at all of its grounds between November 25 and December 3. British Basketball created rainbow basketballs for its players to train with alongside wearing the laces. All matches for the EFL, Premier League, Premiership Rugby and the SPFL over the November weekend were set to feature players wearing rainbow laces. The Premier League, in a new official partnership with Stonewall, branded their ball plinths, pitch flags, and handshake boards, and timing boards with rainbow colours. They introduced rainbow-coloured captain's armbands. Following a match between Tottenham Hotspur and West Bromwich Albion, the arch above Wembley Stadium was lit in rainbow colours accompanied by a message in support of the campaign. After coming out that year, referee Ryan Atkin showed his support.

The 2018 campaign had a particular focus on recognising how to be an LGBTQ ally. Women's football, which newly signed up for Rainbow Laces that year, engaged with the initiative on the weekend of 17–18 November, with the Premier League, Football League and Scottish League clubs promoting it after the international break. The Welsh Rugby Union, both as part of Rainbow Laces and in response to a homophobic attack perpetrated against rugby player Gareth Thomas, made the laces available to their national teams, as did the national rugby teams of France, New Zealand and the USA in support of Thomas. Some members of the England rugby team, Sam Underhill and Ben Te'o, chose not to wear the laces; Underhill spoke in strong support of Thomas but said they were too thick and thus uncomfortable in his boots, and Te'o said he hadn't "got the laces. I’ll just leave my boots as they are, as I’ve had them for the autumn." At a match in December, Watford fans held up cards to turn the crowd into a large rainbow flag in support of Rainbow Laces. At Wembley Stadium, Stonewall F.C. played a match against the Wilberforce Wanderers as part of the campaign in December; it was the former team's first regular-season non-league match to be played at national stadium. Posts by clubs including Manchester United, Arsenal and Chelsea that showed their solidarity with Rainbow Laces received thousands of homophobic responses on social media Gay rights campaigner Peter Tatchell said that "Quite clearly, the existing campaigns have not been sufficient," though he suggested that "these bigoted comments are coming from a hardcore minority and do not reflect the views of most fans."

In November 2019, The Independent reported that Rainbow Laces had thus far been a "huge success" and that it had tread "carefully yet meaningfully". For that year's campaign, 15 different sports were set to take part from 22 November until 8 December. At the same time, The Independent noted that there were only 11 Rainbow Laces ambassadors, with football's sole representative being National League referee Ryan Atkin.

In 2021, Liverpool manager Jurgen Klopp displayed his support for the cause as Liverpool F.C. became a pioneer for Stonewall, and Klopp announced that there is an open dressing room within his team. He also ensured there will never be any issues with LGBTQ+ rights in the Liverpool dressing room.

=== 2026–present: Relaunch with widened focus ===
In January 2026, Stonewall relaunched the Rainbow Laces campaign, attempting to encompass a wider focus on all sports rather than solely football and to be a longer-term campaign rather than focussed on intermittent dates. In February, the Premier League announced that it would be ending its partnership with the Rainbow Laces campaign, instead launching a six-day 'Premier League With Pride' initiative involving LED advertising around stadiums and digital artwork. This was launched in partnership with national LGBTQ support line Switchboard.
