= National symbols of England =

The national symbols of England are things which are emblematic, representative, or otherwise characteristic of England or English culture. Some are established, official symbols; for example, the Royal Arms of England, which has been codified in heraldry. Other symbols may not have official status, for one reason or another, but are likewise recognised at a national or international level.

== Flags ==
The national flag of England, known as St George's Cross, has been England's national flag since the 13th century. Originally the flag was used by the maritime state the Republic of Genoa. The English monarch paid a tribute to the Doge of Genoa from 1190 onwards, so that English ships could fly the flag as a means of protection when entering the Mediterranean. A red cross acted as a symbol for many Crusaders in the 12th and 13th centuries. It became associated with Saint George, along with countries and cities, which claimed him as their patron saint and used his cross as a banner. Since 1606, the St George's Cross has formed part of the design of the Union Flag, a Pan-British flag designed by King James I.
The Royal Banner of England (also known as the Banner of the Royal Arms, the Banner of the King) is the English banner of arms; it features the Royal Arms of England. This Royal Banner differs from England's national flag, St George's Cross, in that it does not represent any particular area or land, but rather symbolises the sovereignty vested in the rulers thereof.

== Flora and fauna ==
The English Bulldog
The Lion is an official national animal of England. In the Middle Ages, the lions kept in the menagerie at the Tower of London were Barbary lions. English medieval warrior rulers with a reputation for bravery attracted the nickname "the Lion": the most famous example is Richard I of England, known as Richard the Lionheart. Lions are frequently depicted in English heraldry, either as a device on shields themselves, or as supporters. They also appear in sculpture, and sites of national importance. The lion is used as a symbol of English sporting teams, such as the England national cricket team.
The oak (specifically, the English oak) is the national tree of England, representing strength and endurance. The Royal Oak and Oak Apple Day commemorate the escape of King Charles II from the grasps of the Parliamentarians (Roundheads) after the Battle of Worcester in 1651 (the last battle of the English Civil War); he hid in an oak tree to avoid detection before making it safely into exile. The Major Oak is an 800–1000 year old oak in Sherwood Forest, fabled as the principal hideout of Robin Hood.
The rose is England's national flower. A Tudor rose is officially used, signifying the unification of the warring parties of the Wars of the Roses under the Tudor dynasty—the red rose representing the House of Lancaster; the White, the House of York. A red rose is often substituted, and is used, for instance, in the emblems of the English Golf Union and the England national rugby union team.

== Food and drink ==
A full English breakfast usually consists of back bacon, sausages (usually pork), eggs (fried, poached or scrambled), fried or grilled tomatoes, fried mushrooms, bread (either as it is, fried, toasted, or a combination of these), black pudding, baked beans, and sometimes hash browns.
Fish and chips has been a recognisable cultural and culinary symbol of England since the mid-19th century. A strong contender for the unofficial title of England's national dish, it remains hugely popular as an affordable and nutritious takeaway meal.
Roast beef and Yorkshire pudding is a widely consumed part of English cuisine, and is symbolic of England. It is another contender for the title of England's national dish, supported by a song dating from 1731 called The Roast Beef of Old England, and the French nickname for English people: les rosbifs ("the roast beefs").
Tea is symbolic of England. In 2006, a government-sponsored survey confirmed that a cup of tea constituted a national symbol of England. In an alternative view, it may be considered symbolic of Britain rather than England alone for its historical British connection with the British Empire and India, and is not specifically pre-Union of the Crowns or pre-Union of Parliaments. It is also drunk widely and equally in England, Scotland, and Wales.

== Heraldry ==
The Royal Arms of England is a coat of arms symbolising England and the English monarchs. Designed in the High Middle Ages, the Royal Arms was subject to significant alteration as the territory, politics, and rule of the Kingdom of England shifted throughout the Middle Ages. However, the enduring blazon, or technical description, is "Gules three lions passant guardant in pale Or armed and langued Azure", meaning three horizontally positioned gold lions facing the observer, with blue tongues and claws, on a deep red background. Although officially subsumed into the heraldry of the British royal family in 1707, the historic Royal Arms featuring three lions continues to represent England on several coins of the pound sterling, forms the basis of several emblems of English national sports teams (such as the England national football team), and endures as one of the most recognisable national symbols of England.
St Edward's Crown was one of the English Crown Jewels and remains one of the senior Crown Jewels of the United Kingdom, often being used as the coronation crown. Since 1952, two-dimensional representations of the crown have been used in coats of arms, badges, and various other insignia to indicate the authority of the monarch throughout the Commonwealth realms.
The Tudor rose, which takes its name from the Tudor dynasty, was adopted as a national emblem of England around the time of the Wars of the Roses as a symbol of peace. It is a syncretic symbol in that it merged the white rose of the Yorkists and the red rose of the Lancastrians — cadet branches of the Plantagenets — who went to war over control of the royal house. It is also known as the Rose of England.

== Literature ==
Geoffrey Chaucer (c. 1342/43–1400): "the first finder of our language", his Middle English collection of 24 stories The Canterbury Tales remains among the greatest poetic works of English literature.
William Shakespeare (c. 1564–1616): English poet and dramatist often called the English national poet and commonly regarded as the greatest dramatist of all time
Jane Austen (1775–1817): English novelist of the Romantic period. She is most known for Pride and Prejudice, but she published several novels during her lifetime, including Sense and Sensibility and Emma. Austen is also featured on the English £10 note.
Charles Dickens (1812–1870): generally considered the greatest English novelist of the Victorian era, his numerous works include: A Christmas Carol, Great Expectations, and Oliver Twist.
George Orwell (Eric Arthur Blair, 1903–1950): English novelist, essayist and critic whose politically founded works include the allegorical novella Animal Farm and the dystopian novel Nineteen Eighty-Four

== Military ==
Oliver Cromwell (1599–1658): English soldier and statesman, who raised England's status once more to that of a leading power following a decline after the death of Queen Elizabeth I. He believed in religious toleration towards protestant denominations. He was also notable for his intense anti catholic belief and his brutal conquest and ethnic cleansing of Irish Catholics. His beliefs continued to influence political and social ideas until recent times in Ireland.
John Churchill, 1st Duke of Marlborough (1650–1722) commanded the largest allied armies during the Spanish War of Succession (1701–1714). He "fought ten campaigns on the [European] Continent and never lost a battle, never even failed to take a fortress to which he had laid siege".
Horatio Nelson (1758–1805): naval commander whose great success in battle, combined with his humanity as a commander, earned him godlike status in his lifetime. After his death at the Battle of Trafalgar in 1805, he was enshrined in popular myth and iconography. Nelson's Column in London's Trafalgar Square was constructed between 1840 and 1843.
Arthur Wellesley, 1st Duke of Wellington (1769 – 1852) was one of the leading military and political figures in 19th-century Britain. He defeated Napoleon at the Battle of Waterloo in 1815, and served as prime minister twice.

== Motor vehicles ==
AEC Routemaster bus, a double-decker bus designed by London Transport and built by the Associated Equipment Company (AEC) and Park Royal Vehicles; popular with the public, and a perennial favourite with tourists
Rolls-Royce Limited motor cars (1906–1973) and the Spirit of Ecstasy bonnet ornament: the original English company established a reputation worldwide for superior engineering quality and all-round elegance, earning widespread recognition for producing the "best car in the world".
London taxi/black cab/Hackney carriage: Inimitable and timeless taxi design. Only licensed hackney carriages can pick up passengers on the street and without pre-booking. London's traditional black cabs are specially constructed vehicles designed to conform to the standards set out in the Conditions of Fitness. Traditional London taxi drivers are licensed and must have passed an extensive training course (the Knowledge).

== Music ==
Thomas Tallis (1505–1585): English Renaissance composer and considered one of England's greatest composers
William Byrd (c.1539/40 or 1543 - 1623), so-called "father of English music"; A. L. Rowse says Byrd was to music "what Shakespeare was to the theatre".
Edward Elgar (1857–1934): Elgar's status as a symbol of artistic inspiration was celebrated on the English £20 banknote, 1999–2010. Elgar's numerous compositions include the music of the stirring patriotic song "Land of Hope and Glory".
The Beatles: arguably the most significant musical and cultural force of the twentieth century

== Myth and folklore ==
King Arthur, the legendary sovereign of Britain who defeated the Anglo-Saxons in the late 5th and early 6th centuries and appears in an international cycle of chivalric romances (known as the Matter of Britain). It is unknown how legends of King Arthur began, but the literary persona of Arthur began with Geoffrey of Monmouth's pseudo-historical Historia Regum Britanniae (History of the Kings of Britain), written in the 1130s. It is also unknown whether the figure Arthur was based on a historical person, and his historical basis has long been debated by scholars.
Robin Hood is a heroic outlaw in English folklore.

== People ==
Saint George (280–303 AD): the patron saint of England
Alfred the Great (848/49 – 899) was King of Wessex, becoming the dominant ruler in England.
Lady Godiva (died between 1066 and 1086) was a late Anglo-Saxon noblewoman who is regarded as an English hero for her gallant protection of her people against high taxation.
Charles Darwin (1809–1882) was an English naturalist, geologist, and biologist, widely known for his contributions to evolutionary biology and theory of evolution.
Queen Victoria (1819–1901): her reign (1837–1901), known as the Victorian era, was a period of great industrial, cultural, political, scientific, and military change, and was marked by a grand expansion of the British Empire.
Winston Churchill (1874–1965): voted top of the BBC's 2002 100 Greatest Britons poll, Churchill is among the most influential people in English history.
Queen Elizabeth II (1926–2022): Longest reigning monarch of the United Kingdom and the other Commonwealth realms. She was also the first British monarch to have a Platinum Jubilee.

== Miscellaneous ==
Big Ben is the nickname for the Great Bell of the clock at the north end of the Palace of Westminster in London, and often extended to refer to the clock and the clock tower. The tower is officially known as Elizabeth Tower, as it was renamed in 2012 to celebrate the Diamond Jubilee of Elizabeth II. Previously it was known simply as the Clock Tower. Big Ben has become one of England's most prominent symbols.
Buckingham Palace is the historic London residence and the administrative headquarters of the reigning monarch of the United Kingdom. The palace is often the site of state occasions, and has been a focal point at times of national celebration and mourning.
The oldest regiment in the Regular Army in continuous active service, the origin of the Coldstream Guards lies in the English Civil War when Oliver Cromwell gave Colonel George Monck permission to form his own regiment as part of the New Model Army.
Morris dancing is a form of English folk dance normally accompanied by music. It involves rhythmic stepping and choreographed figures by a group of dancers, usually wearing bell pads on their shins. Morris dancers may use sticks, swords and handkerchiefs when dancing. The earliest known surviving English record of Morris dancing is dated to 1448.
The White Cliffs of Dover have great symbolic value in England because they face Continental Europe across the narrowest section of the English Channel, where invasions have historically threatened and against which the cliffs form a symbolic guard. Before air travel, crossing from Dover was the primary route to the continent, so the cliffs also formed the first or last sight of England for those making the journey.
The maypole is a feature in many towns and villages in England. There are maypole dances and celebrations around May Day, which celebrates the coming summer. People dress up and sometimes wear flower crowns; the maypole is decorated with ribbons and a wreath.
There are many local fêtes in spring and summer. These are outdoor events, usually organised by a volunteer committee, possibly the local church, which feature bunting, ribbons, and marquees with various attractions, and serve food such as tea and cake.
Stonehenge is an ancient monument constructed from around 3000 BC to 2000 BC that is considered a cultural icon and has been depicted many times in British culture, including on stamps. This is demonstrated by the Royal Navy exploiting this sense of identification by naming an S-class destroyer and one of their S-class submarines HMS Stonehenge. Thousands of people continue to gather at the stones every summer and winter solistice.

== See also ==
- Pillar box
- Red telephone box
- Symbols of the United Kingdom
