= Coat of arms of Oxford =

- Coat of arms

Versions
- Shield
- Armiger: Oxford
- Crest: Argent an Ox Gules armed and unguled Or passing over a Ford of Water in base barry wavy Azure and Argent
- Motto: Fortis Est Veritas

The coat of arms of Oxford is the official heraldic arms of Oxford, England, used by Oxford City Council.

While the bull is common in heraldry, in the arms of Oxford an ox, which is less common, is used. The arms is canting, showing an ox fording over water. The coat of arms with its crest—a blue imperial lion—and supporters was not formally granted but was recorded at the heraldic visitation on 12 August 1634. The oldest image of the ox on the water is from a seal for Oxford from the 14th Century. The water is most likely the Isis, which runs through the city.

It is not known today what the supporters—an Elephant Ermines eared Argent tusked Or collared and lined Or and a Beaver Vert its tail barry wavy Azure and Argent ducally gorged and lined Or—were meant to symbolize. Both of the beasts also appear in the arms of families associated with the city's history. The tincture of the elephant is ermines, a fur which can also be called counter-ermine. The crown around the neck of the beaver is a duke's coronet.

The crest shows a lion, which despite its tincture is supposed to be the English lion, as it is crowned with an imperial crown. It is holding a Royal Tudor rose.

The shield was used in the logo of Morris Motors, which started in Oxford.

== Blazon ==
Arms: Argent an Ox Gules armed and unguled Or passing over a Ford of Water in base barry wavy Azure and Argent. Crest: On a Wreath of the Colours a demi Lion rampant guardant Azure crowned with an Imperial Crown proper holding between the paws a Rose Gules charged with another Argent. Supporters: On the dexter side an Elephant Ermines eared Argent tusked Or collared and lined Or and on the sinister side a Beaver Vert its tail barry wavy [= scaly] Azure and Argent ducally gorged and lined Or. Motto: FORTIS EST VERITAS - The truth is strong.
