= Royal badges of England =

A royally crowned Tudor rose

In heraldry, the royal badges of England comprise the heraldic badges that were used by the monarchs of the Kingdom of England.

Heraldic badges are distinctive to a person or family, similar to the arms and the crest. But unlike them, the badge is not an integral component of a coat of arms, although they can be displayed alongside them. Badges are in fact complete and independent and can be displayed alone. Furthermore, unlike the arms and crest, which are personal devices that could only be displayed by the owner, the badge could be easily borne by others, in the form of a cognizance or livery badge, to be worn by retainers and adherents. Badges are displayed on standards and personal objects, as well as on private and public buildings to show ownership or patronage.

== History ==
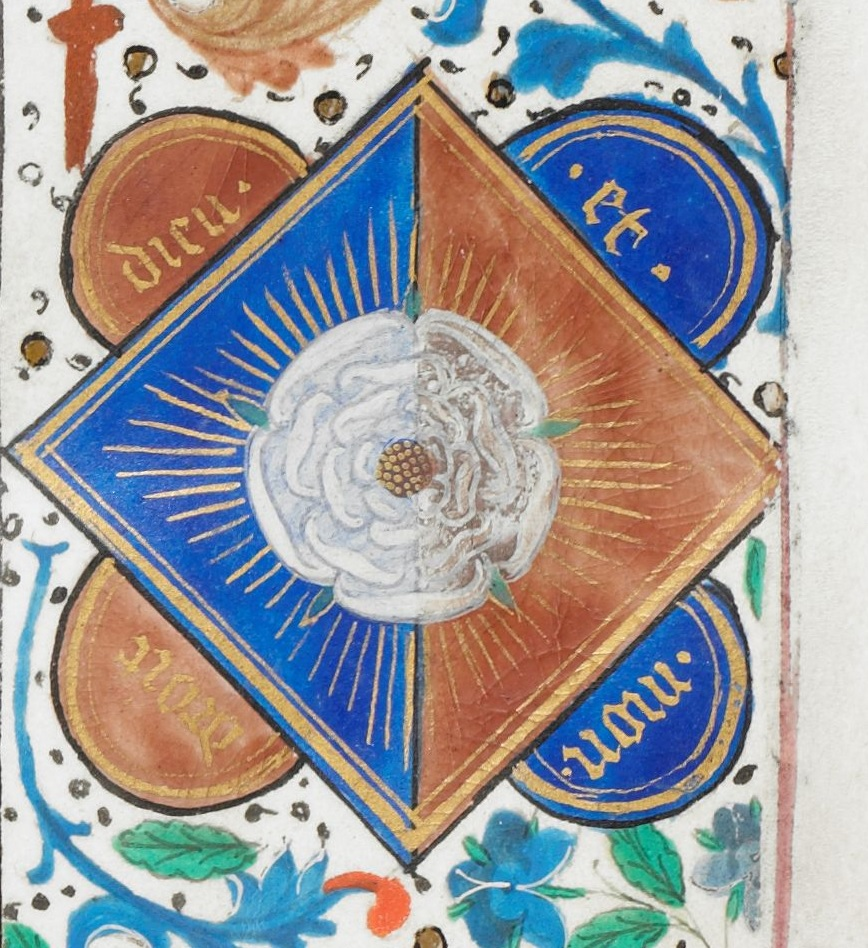
The White Rose en soleil (imposed on a sun in splendour) of the House of York, upon the livery colours blue and murrey of the Yorkist dynasty, surrounded by the royal motto Dieu et mon droit. From a manuscript (1478–1480) of the Speculum historiale belonging to King Edward IV.

Royal badges have been in use since the earliest stages of English heraldry. They are invariably simple devices, and numerous examples were adopted and inherited by various sovereigns. These are found in the glass and fabric of royal palaces and memorial chapels, and sometimes in the houses of those who enjoyed or anticipated royal patronage.

The earliest royal heraldic badge is a sprig of common broom, said to have been worn by Geoffrey of Anjou in his cap. The broom plant or Plantegenest (planta genista in medieval Latin), thus became Geoffrey's nickname; "Plantagenet". The heraldic device also became the name of the dynasty that was borne from him, which was to rule England for over 300 years. The Plantagenet kings would use this badge, sometimes combining it with other more personal devices. King Henry II used the 'planta genista' as well as an escarbuncle. King Richard I used a star and crescent device, which was also adopted by his brother King John. King Henry III adopted the broom sprig and the star and crescent. His son Edward I in addition to these, added the golden rose device that he inherited from his mother Eleanor of Provence. King Edward II further added the golden castle of Castile, inherited from his mother Eleanor of Castile.

It was actually Richard of York, 3rd Duke of York who adopted the Plantagenet name for him and his descendants in the 15th century. It is obscure why Richard chose the name but it emphasised Richard's hierarchal status as Geoffrey's, and six English kings', patrilineal descendant during the Wars of the Roses. The retrospective usage of the name for all Geoffrey's male descendants became popular in the Tudor period, probably encouraged by the added legitimacy it gave Richard's great-grandson, King Henry VIII.

Badges came into general use by the reign of King Edward III. The king himself deployed many badges alluding to his lineage, as well as new personal devices.

== List of royal badges ==
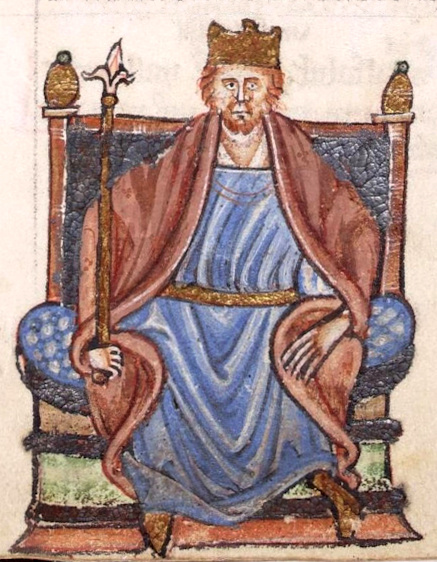
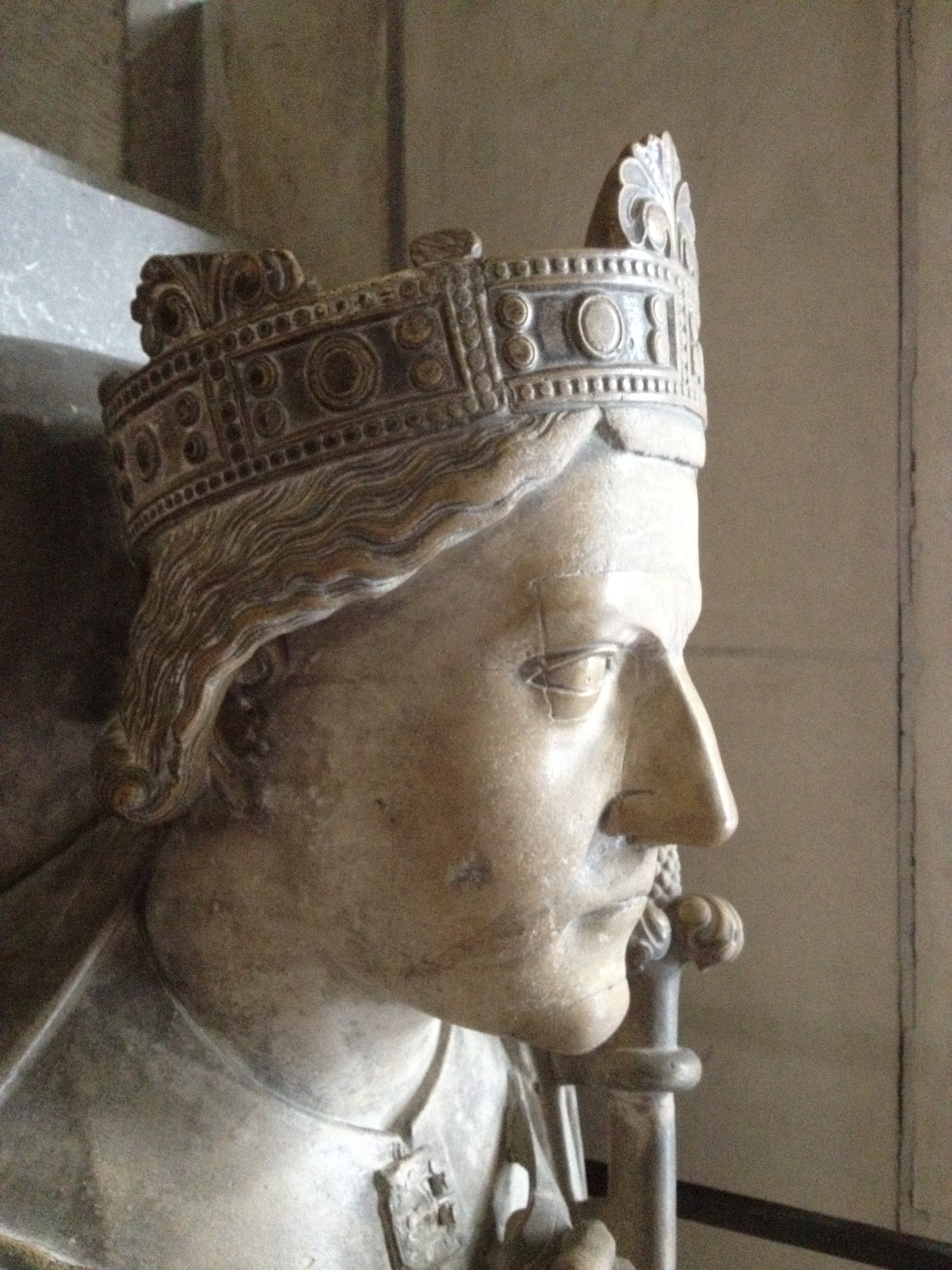
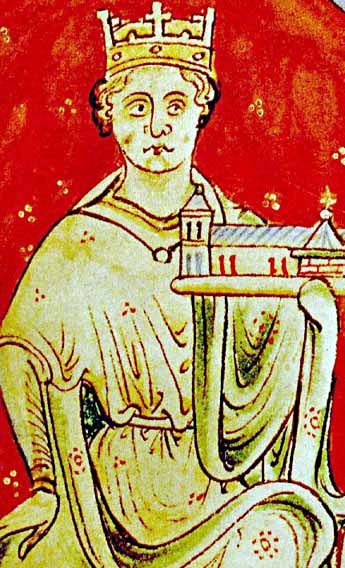
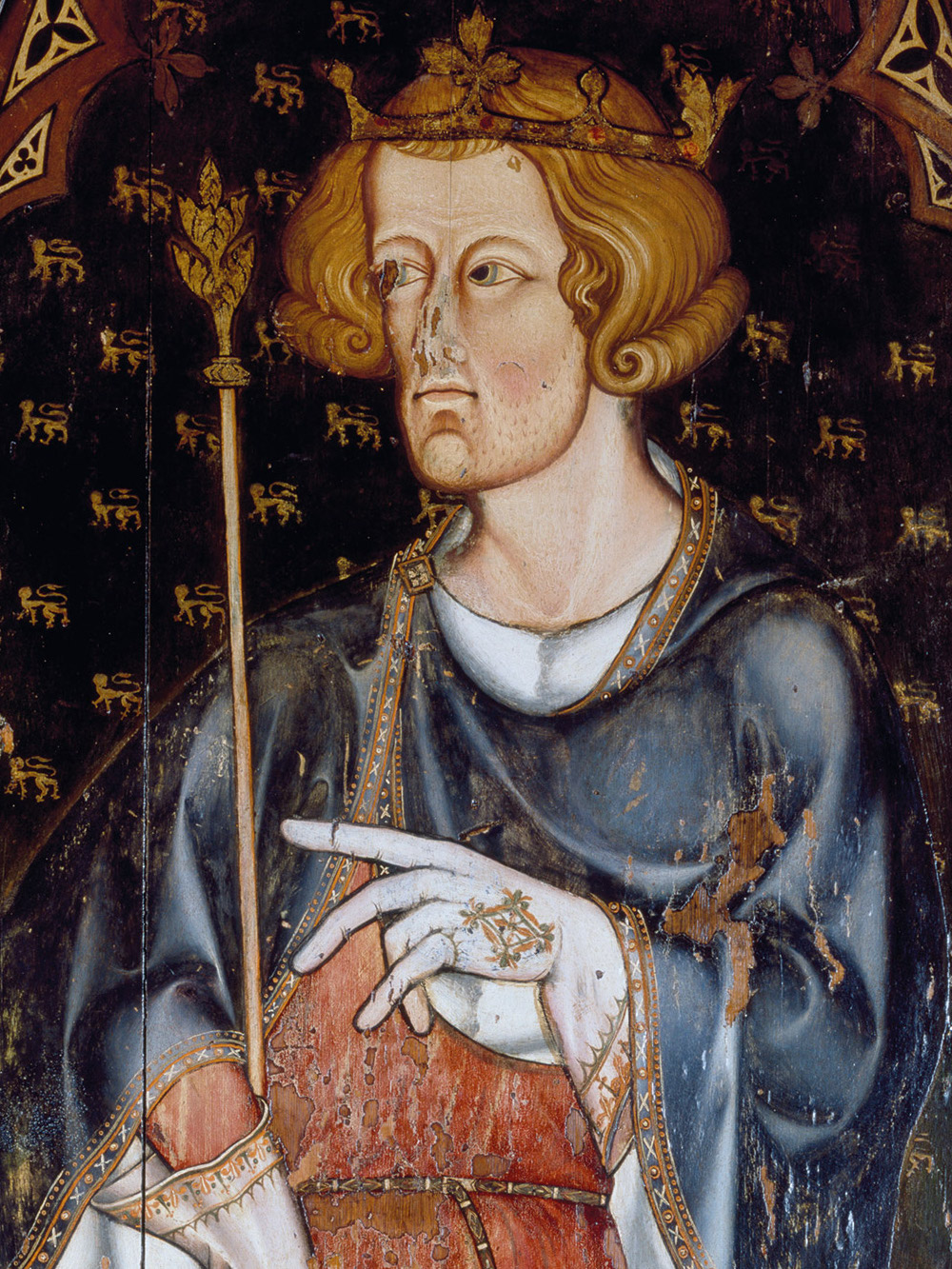
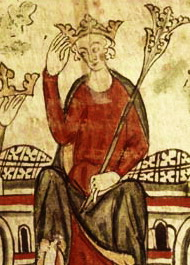
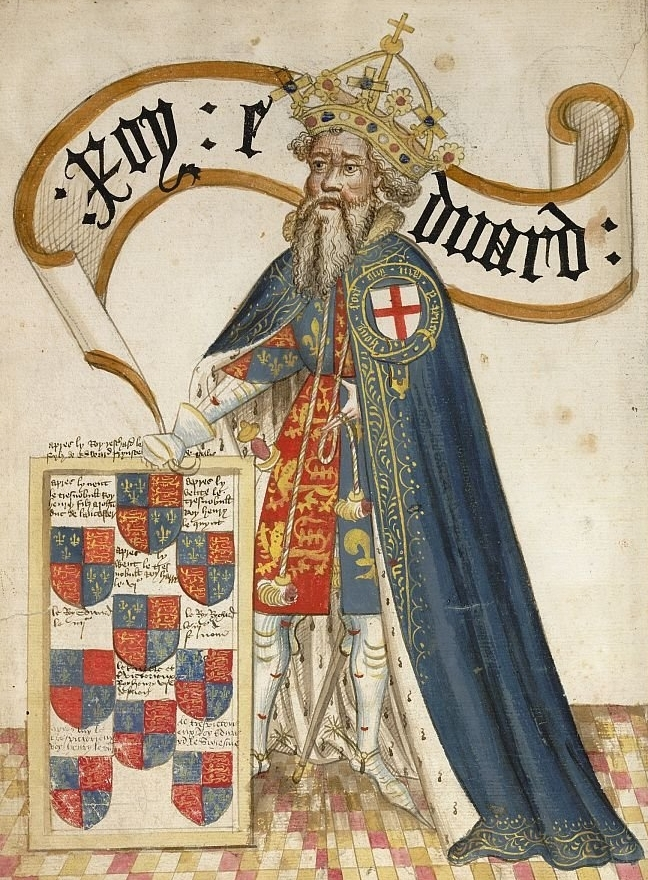
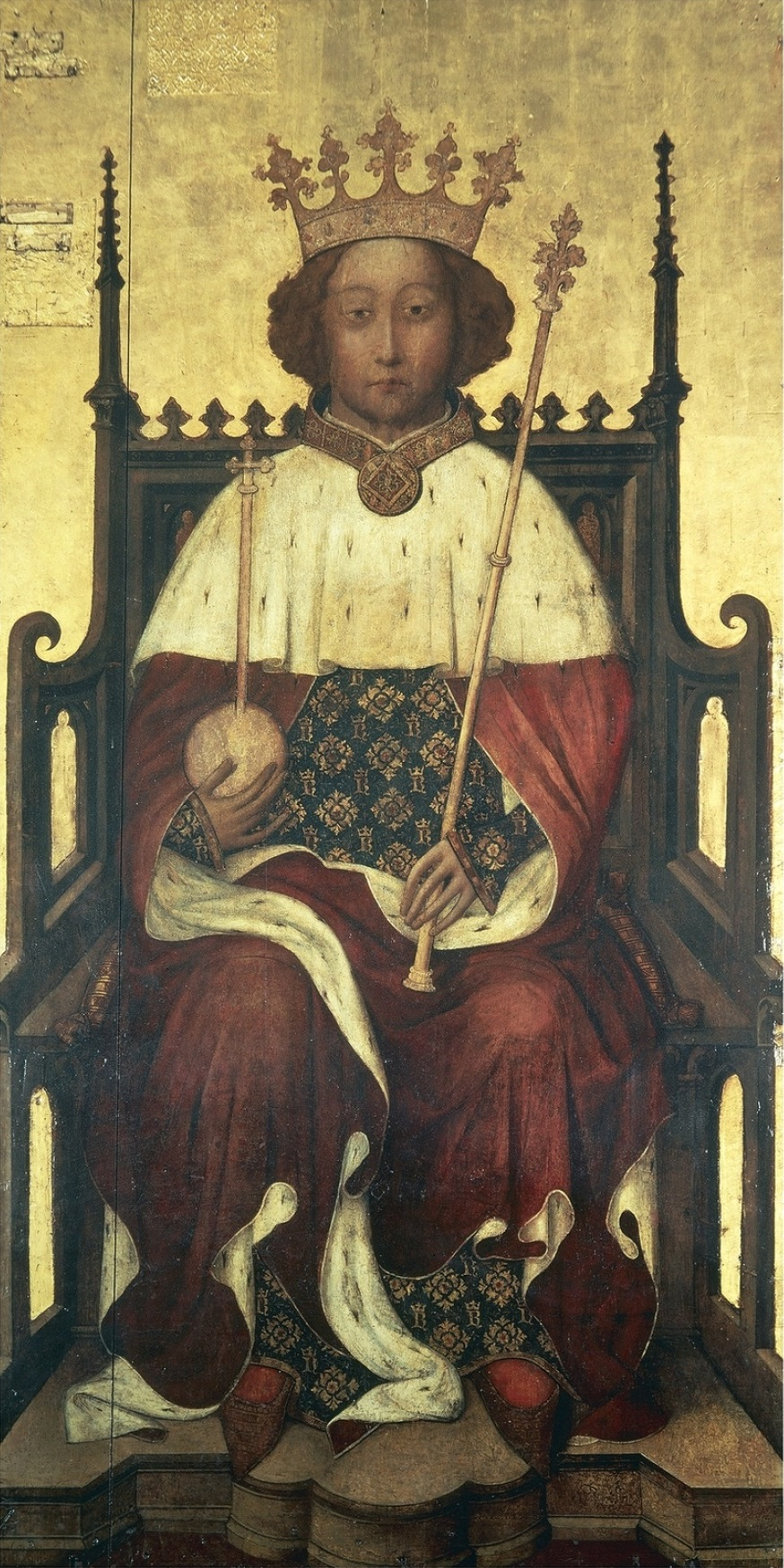
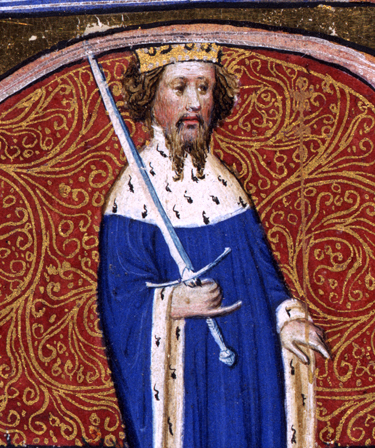
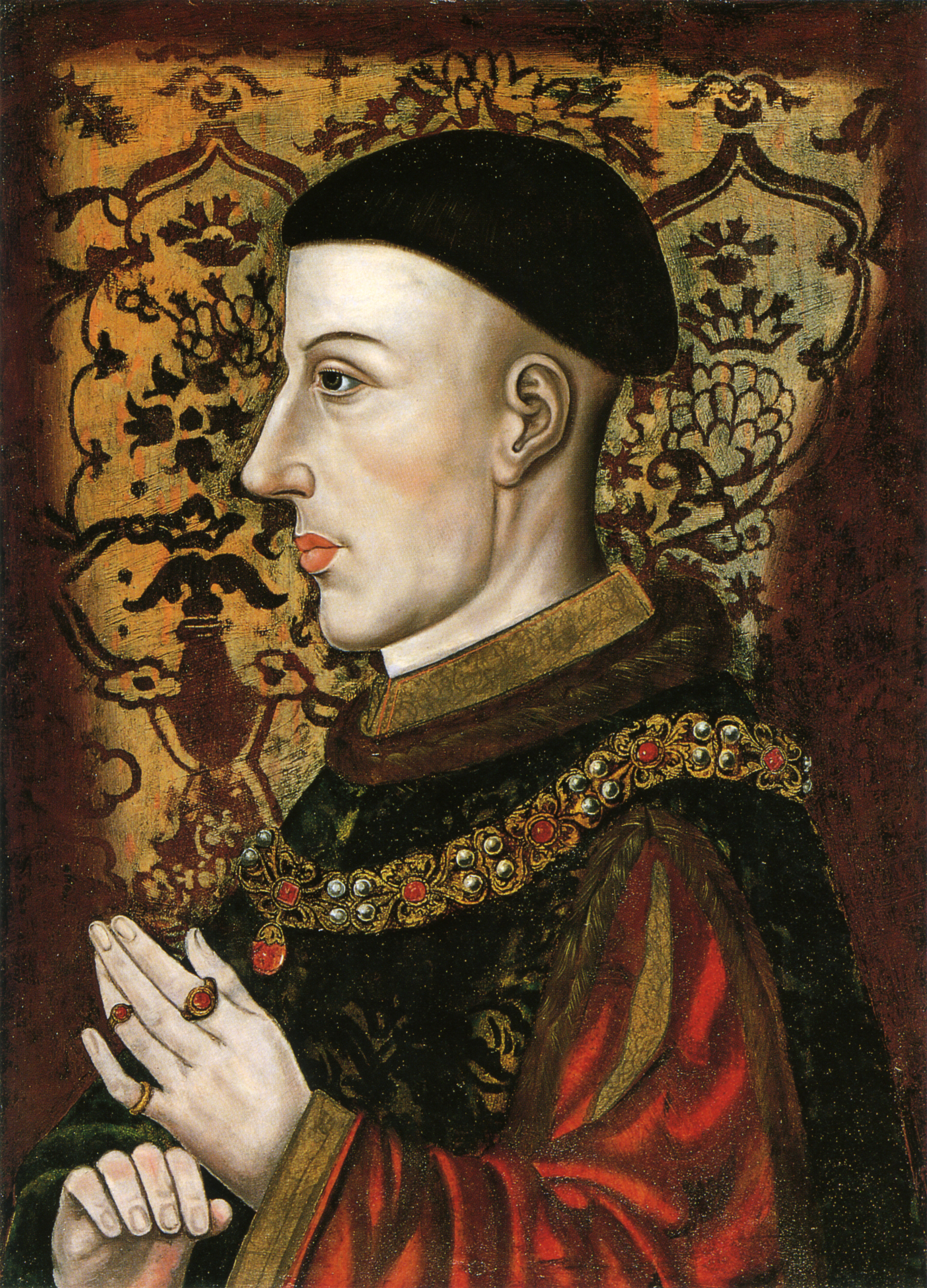
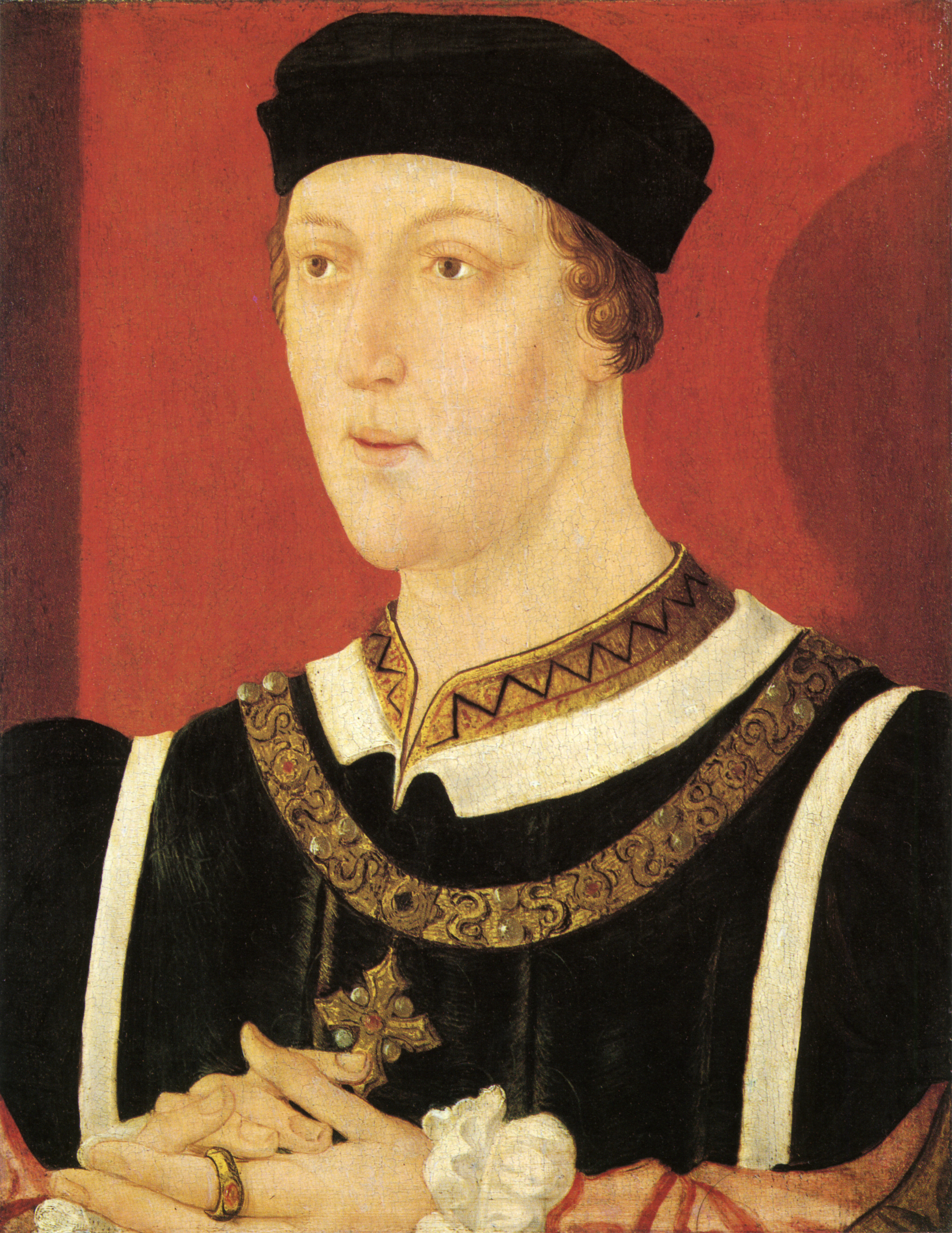
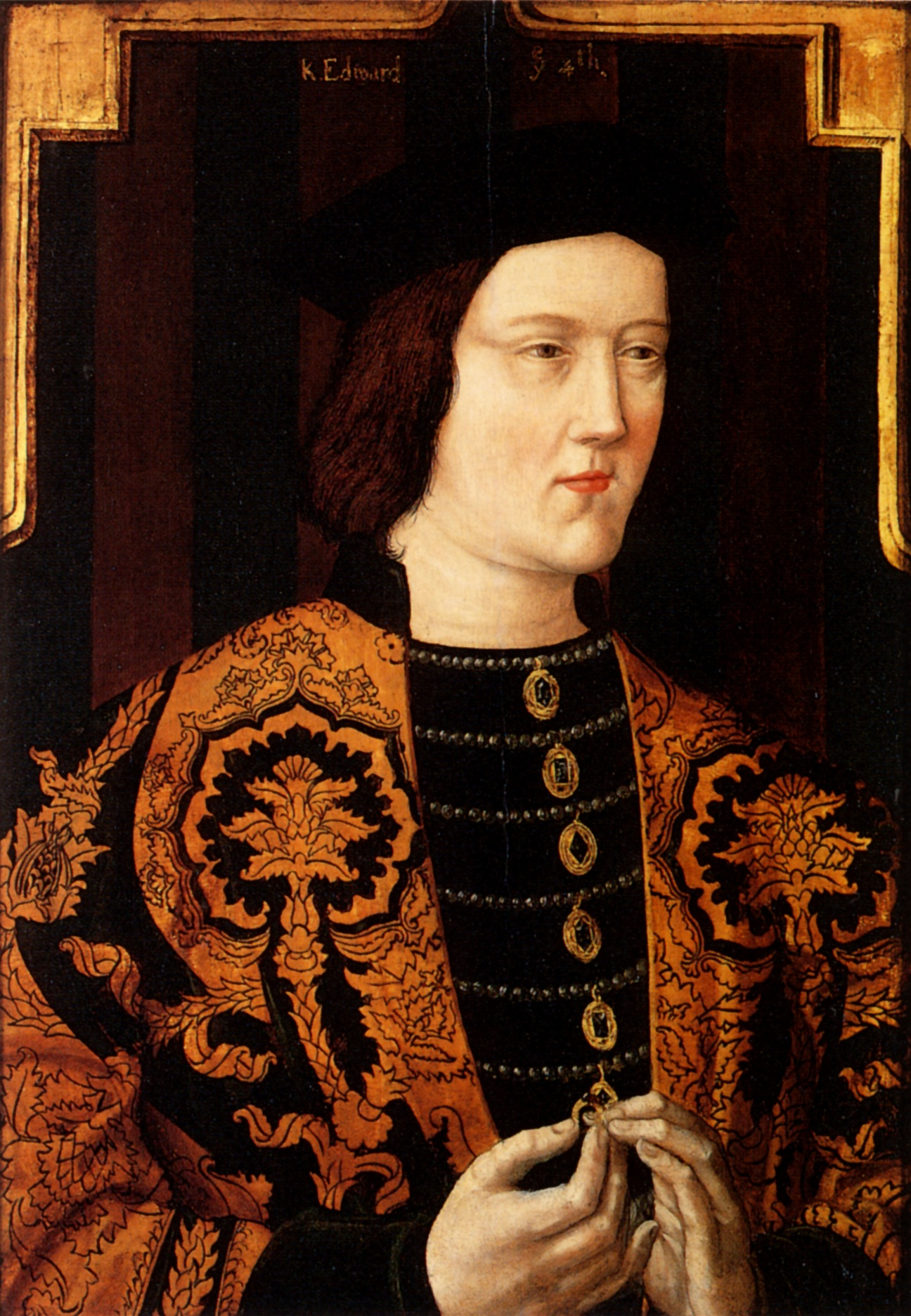
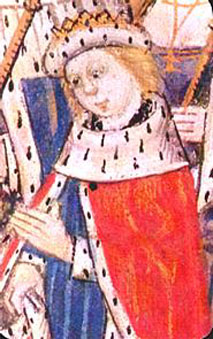
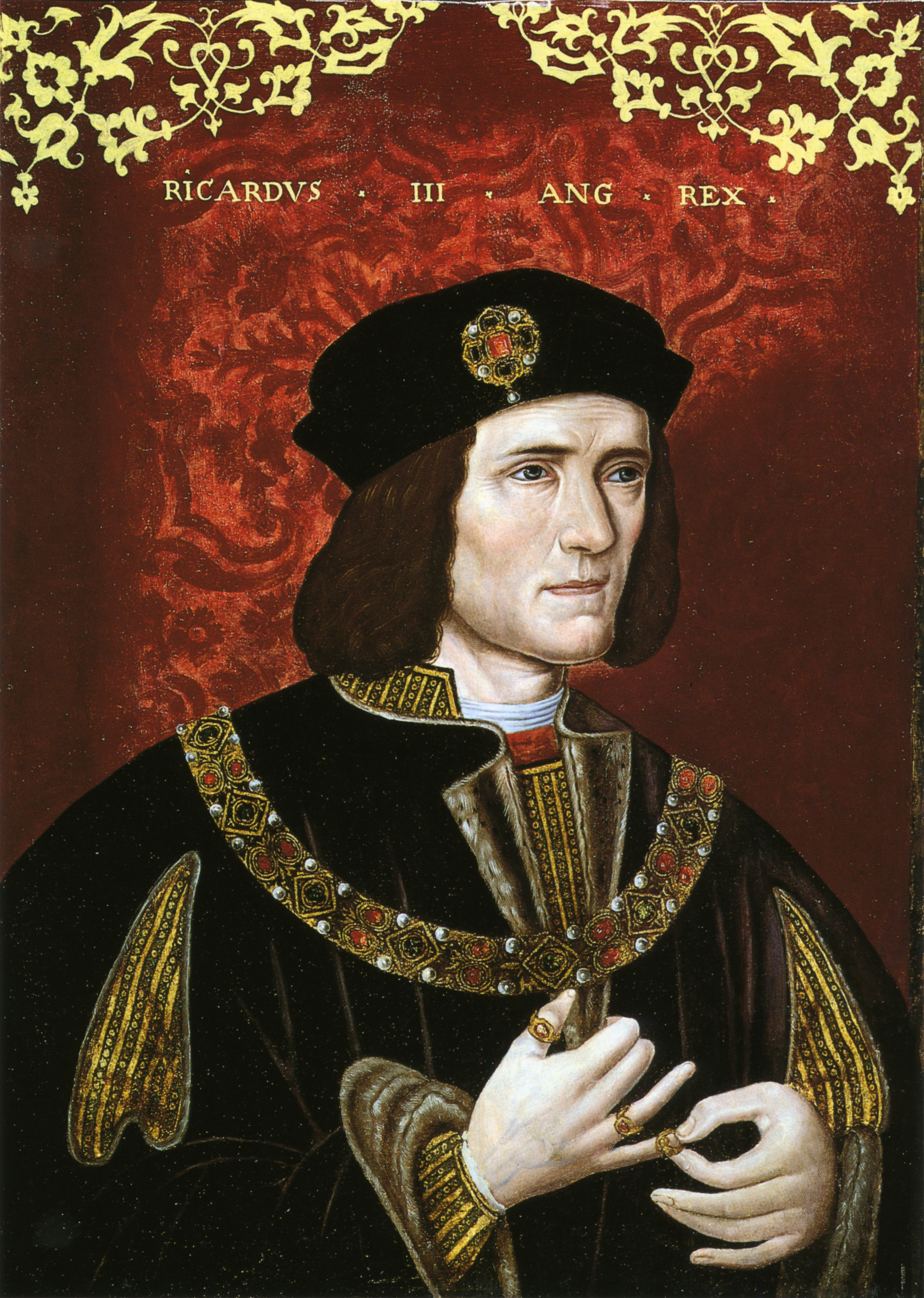
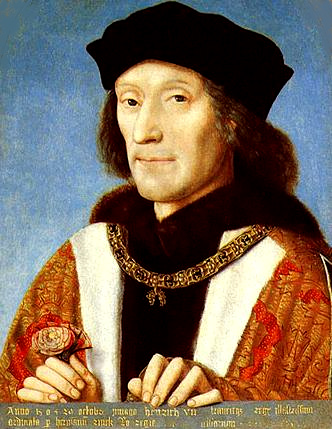
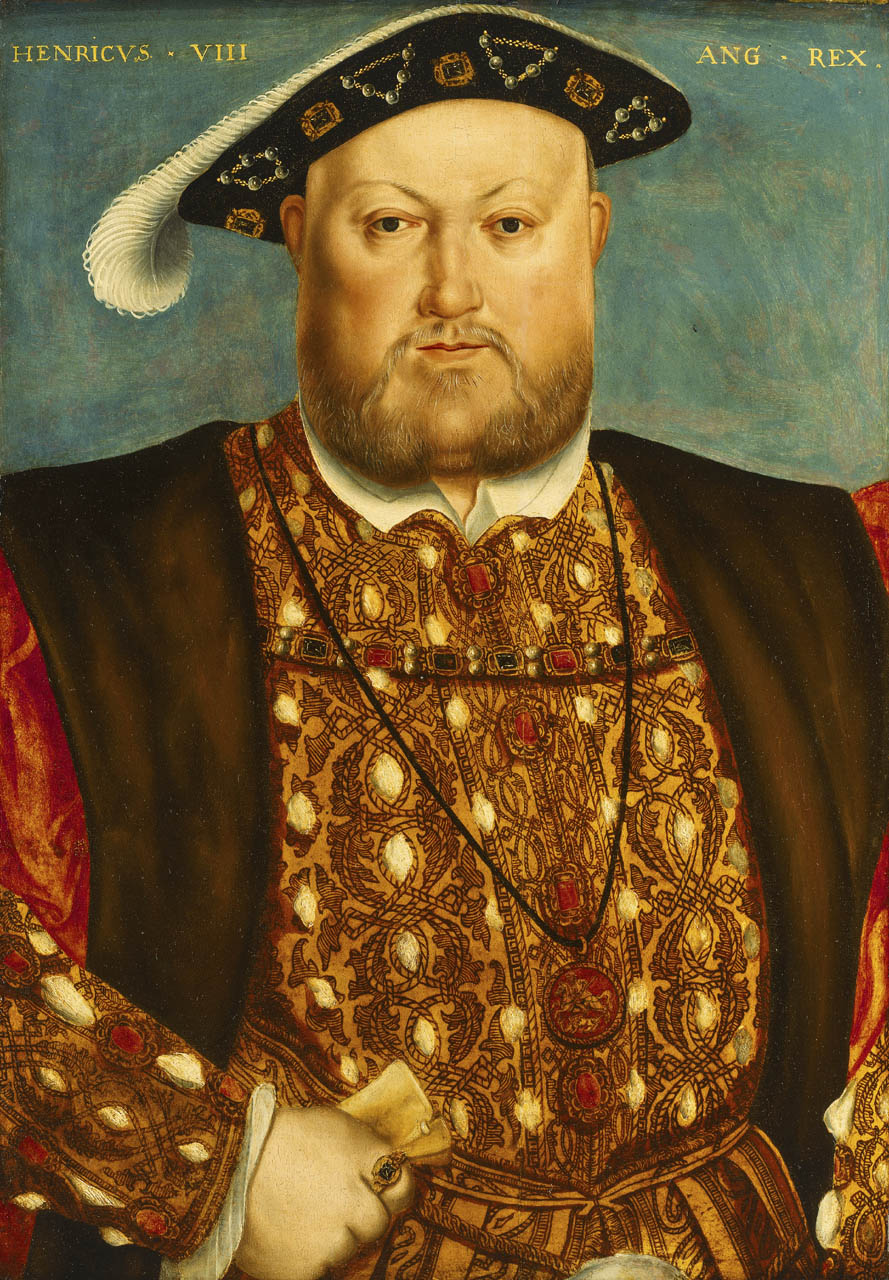
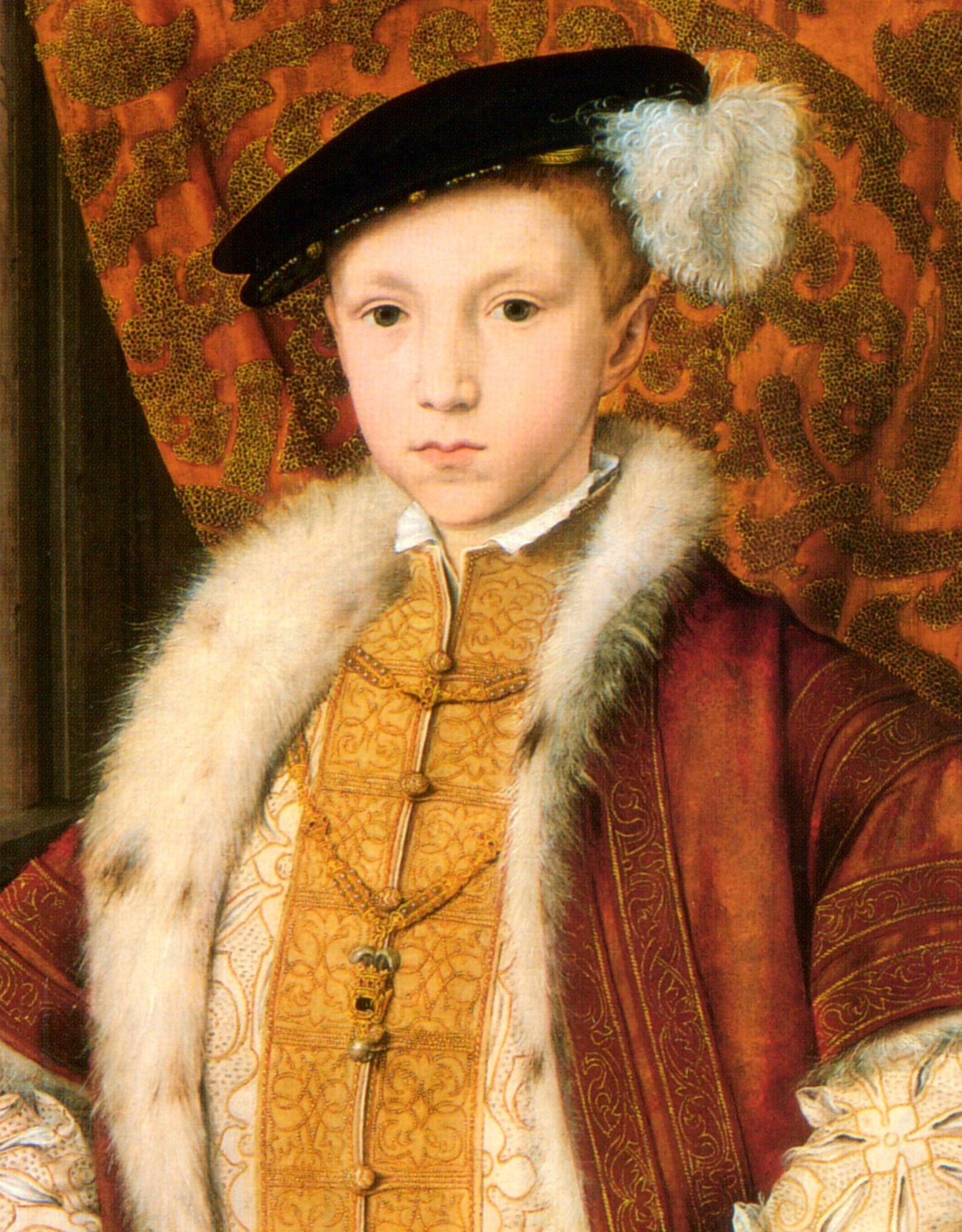
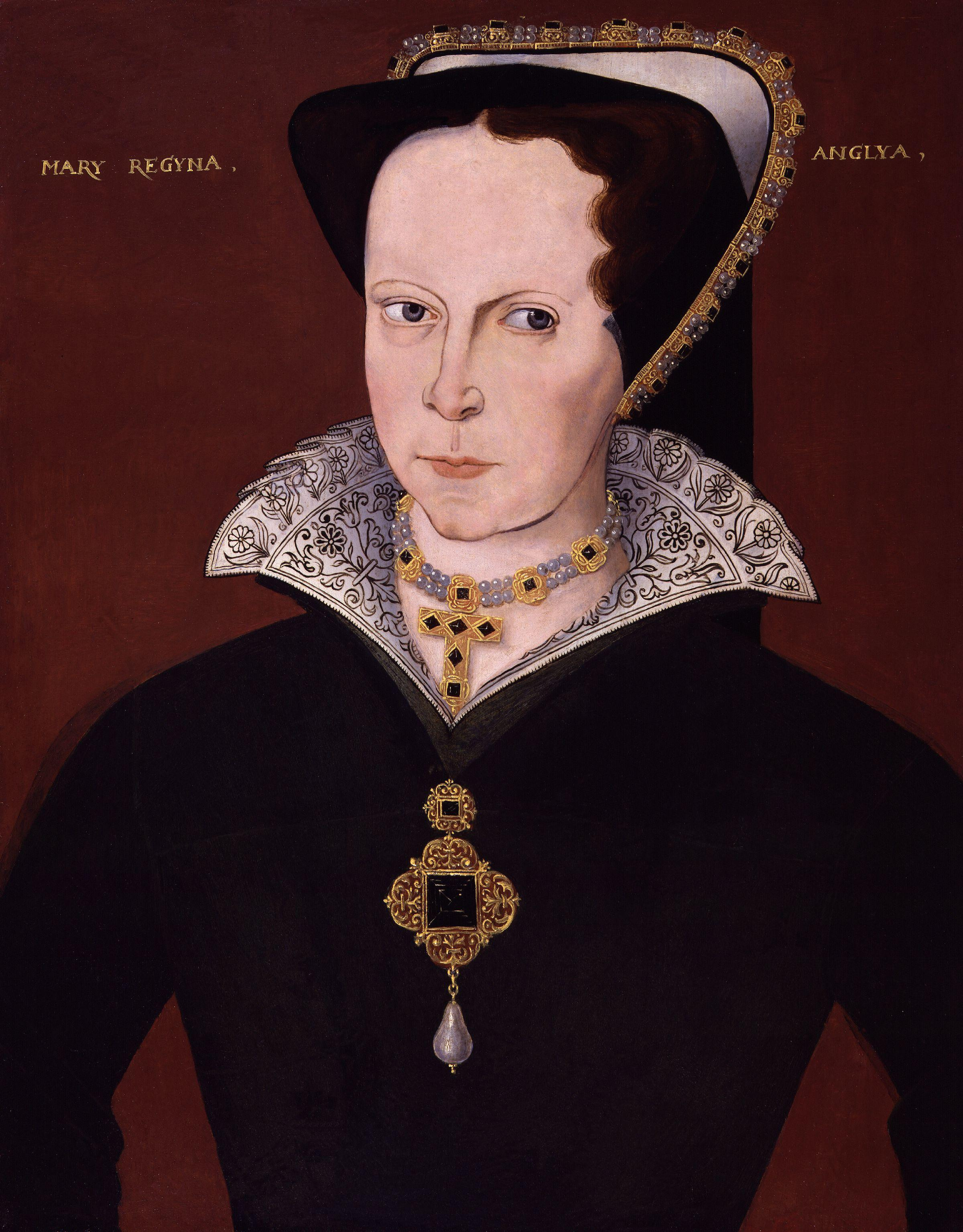
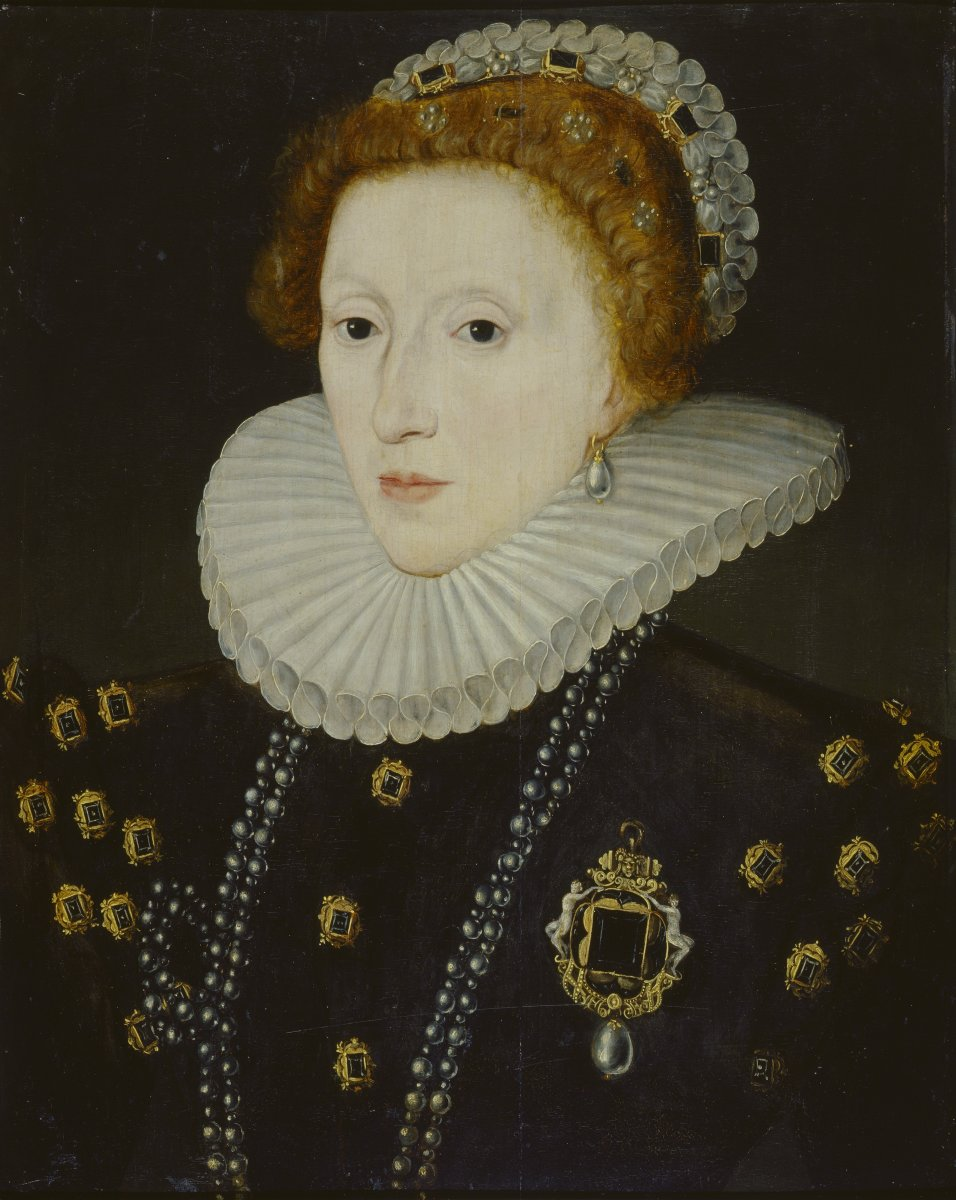
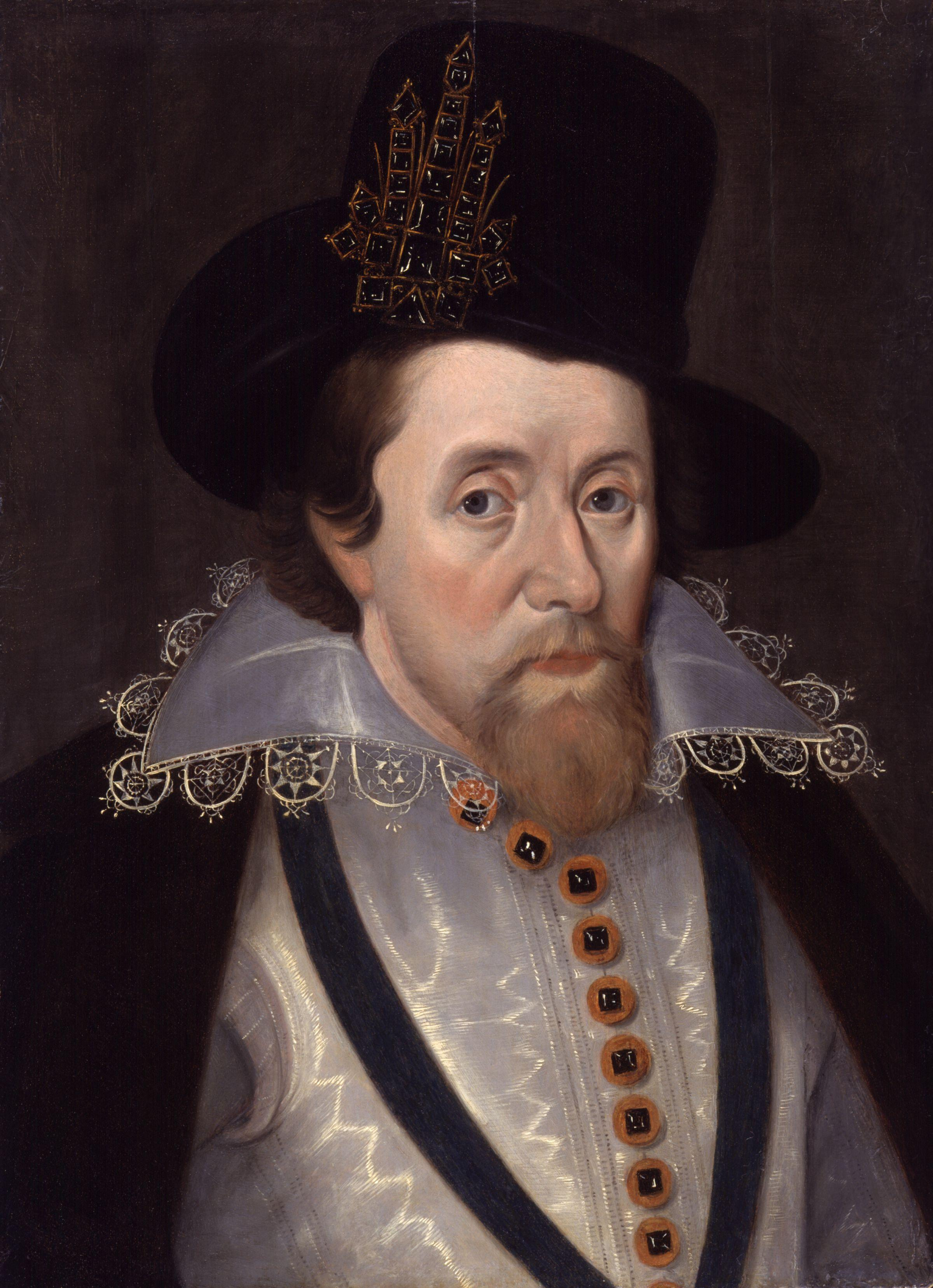
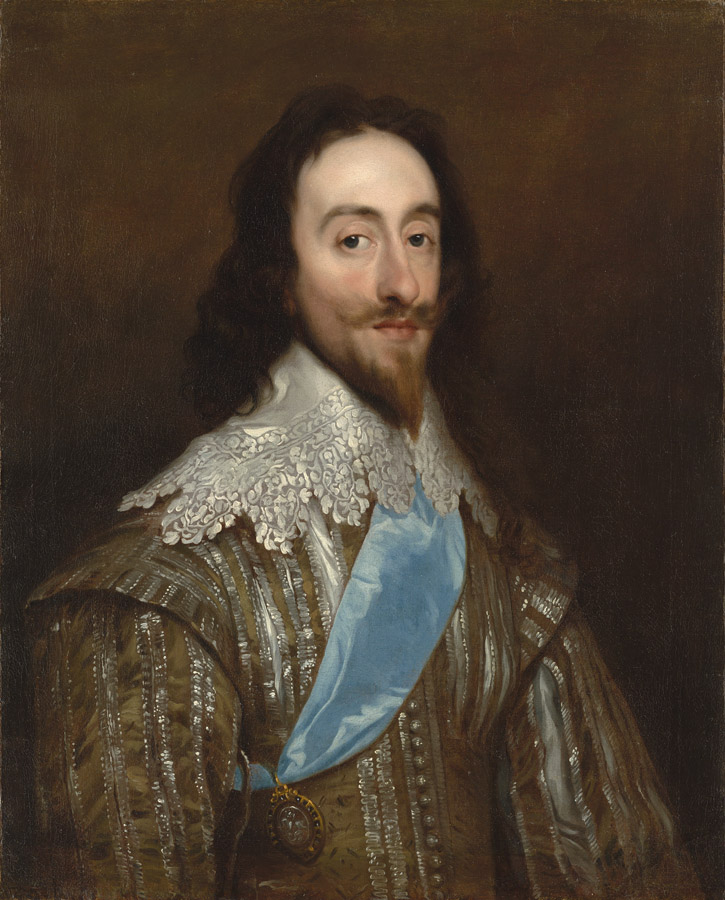
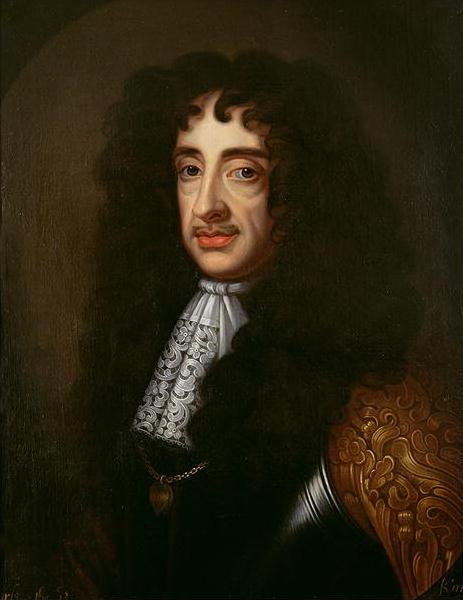
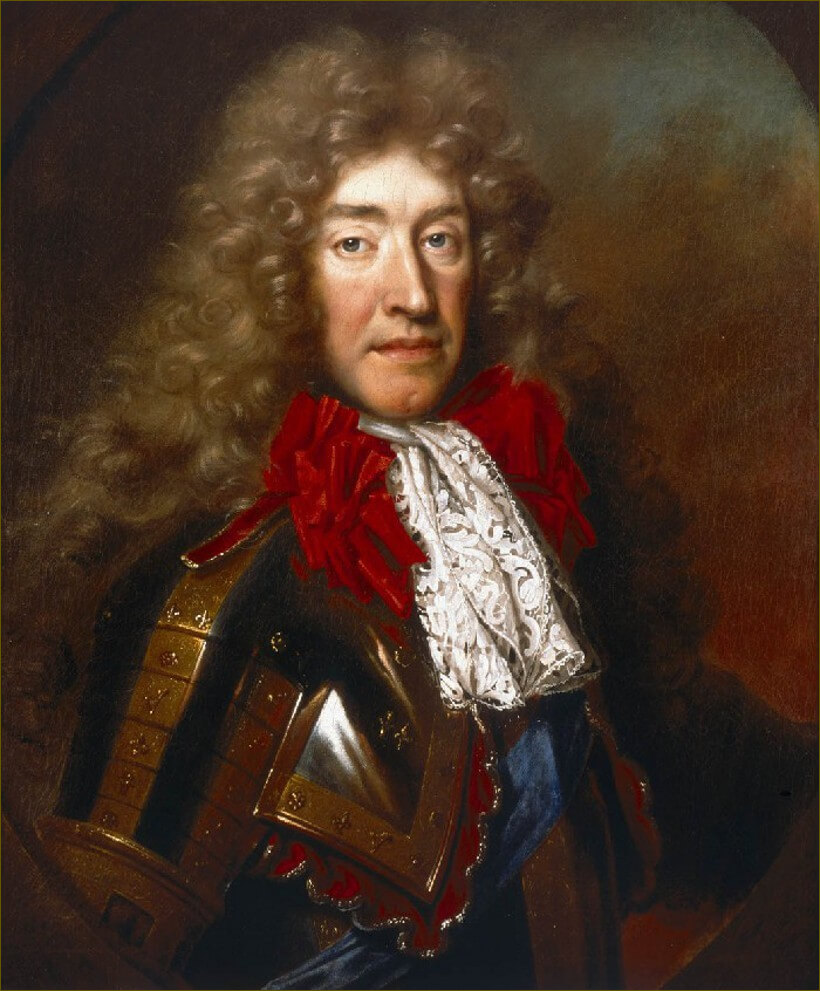
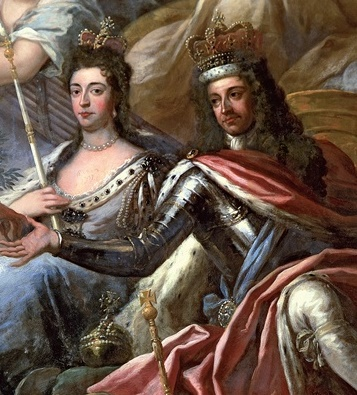
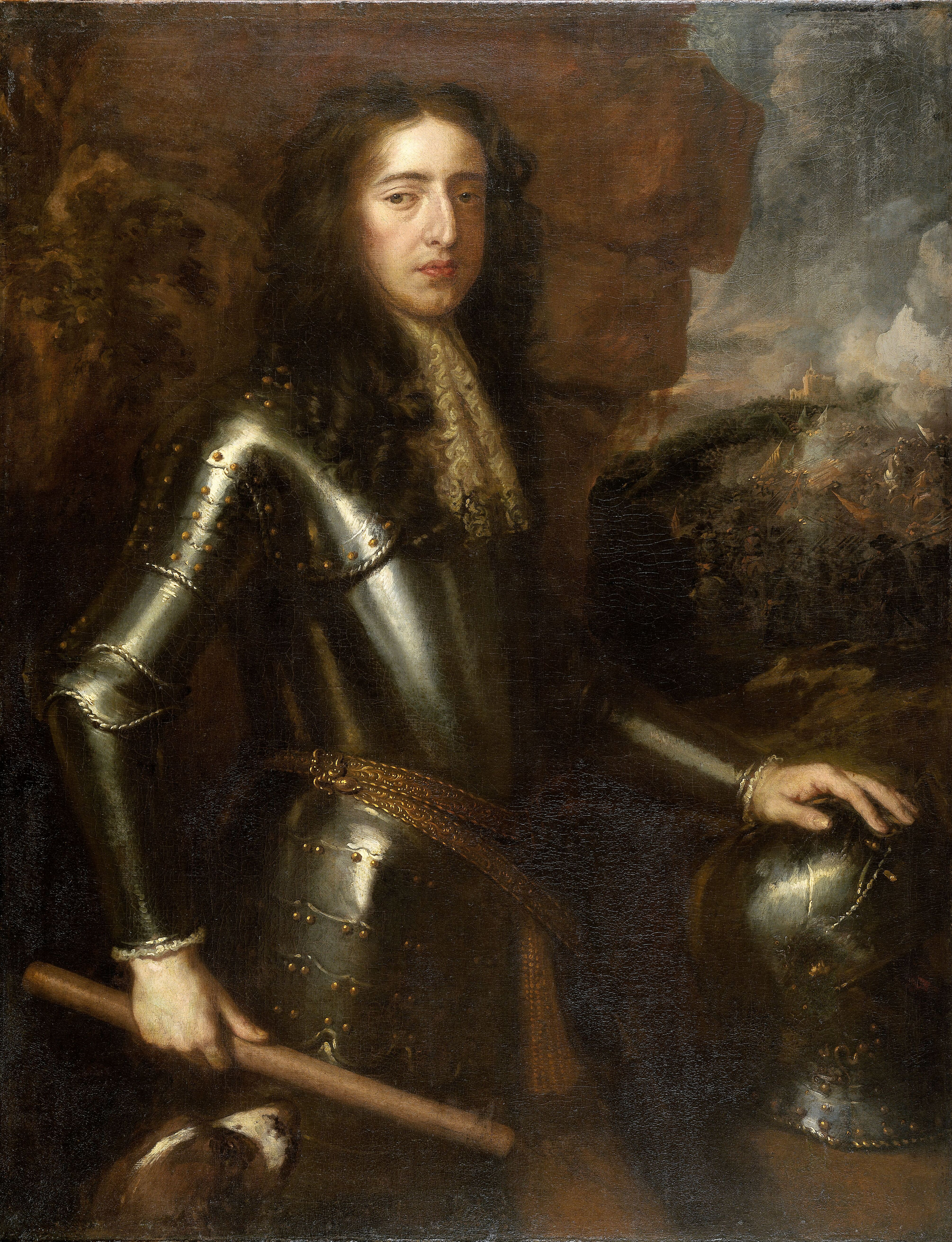
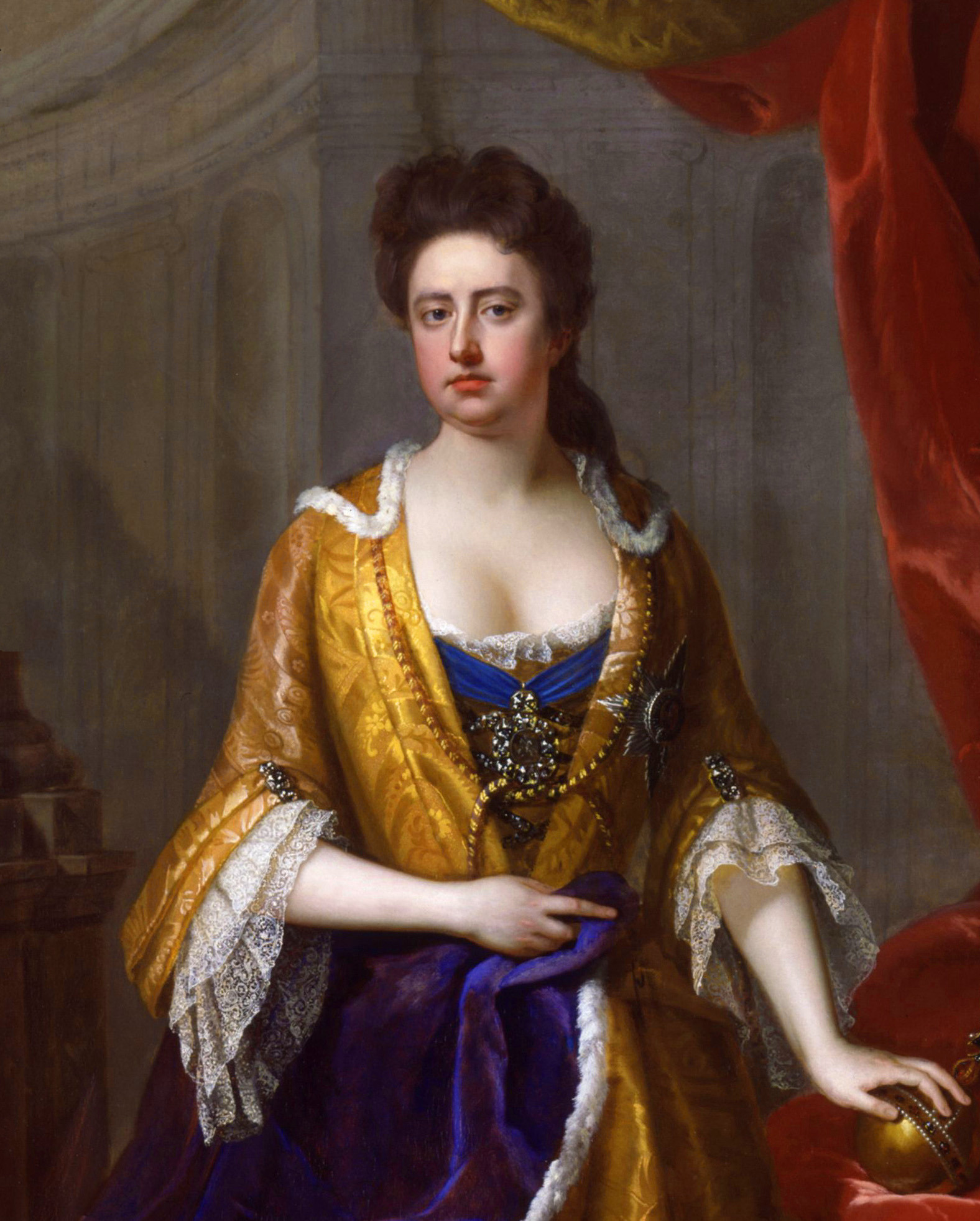
Monarch (Reign)	Badges	Examples
House of Plantagenet (1154–1399)
Henry II (1154–1189)	a golden escarbuncle; a sprig of broom or planta genista
Richard I (1189–1199)	a golden star and crescent; a sprig of broom
John (1199–1216)	a golden star and crescent; a sprig of broom
Henry III (1216–1272)	a sprig of broom
Edward I (1272–1307)	a golden rose, the stalk green; a sprig of broom
Edward II (1307–1327)	a golden tower (for his mother Eleanor of Castile); a sprig of broom
Edward III (1327–1377)	a golden rose, the stalk green; a Sunburst, or rays Or issuing from a cloud; a Sprig of broom, "Planta genista" (first used by Geoffrey of Anjou as a personal symbol); a Stock (stump) of a tree eradicated and couped (for Woodstock); a Falcon Argent; a Gryphon; an Ostrich feather (for his wife; Philippa of Hainault); a Fleur-de-lis Or (For France; and his mother Isabella of France); a Sword; a Sword erect on a chapeau, its blade enfiled with three crowns; a Boar; a Dragon Or, "clothed with the king's arms ... nicknamed 'Drago'"; a Leopard
Richard II (1377–1399)	a Sunburst; a Hart Argent lodged, ducally gorged and chained Or (from his mother; Joan of Kent); a Stock (stump) of a tree eradicated and couped Or (from his father; Edward of Woodstock; or the Black Prince); a Falcon Argent; a Sprig of broom, Planta genista, the cods open and empty; a Sun in splendour; an Ostrich feather; the Sun clouded
House of Lancaster (1399–1461)
Henry IV (1399–1413)	the monogram SS (unclear meaning, first worn by his father John of Gaunt who was Seneschal of England, Latin: Seneschallus); a Crescent; a Fox's tail; a Stock of a tree; an Ermine, or gennet, between two sprigs of broom; an Eagle, crowned; an Eagle displayed; a Panther, crowned; an Ostrich feather encircled by a scroll bearing the word "SOVEREYGNE"; a Columbine flower; the Red rose of Lancaster; a Sun in splendour; a Rose en soleil (a combination of the last two badges); a White swan (from the Bohun swan, from the de Bohun family of Mary de Bohun; Henry IV's first wife); an Antelope Argent (also from the De Bohun family)
Henry V (1413–1422)	an Ostrich feather Argent; an Ostrich feather erect Argent with a small scroll across the lower part of the quill inscribed "Ich dien"; an Antelope, chained; a Swan, chained; a Fire beacon or cresset; a Stock of a tree; the Red rose of Lancaster; a Fox's tail; a Trunk of a tree eradiated Or (for the Dukedom of Hereford); a Swan, wings elevated Argent, beaked and legged Gules, ducally gorged and a chain reflexed over the back Or (of Hereford); a Swan and antelope lodged, both chained to the fire-beacon and conjoined into one device
Henry VI (1422–1461)	an Antelope, chained; a Swan, chained; a Spotted panther; two Ostrich feathers in saltire, Or and Argent; the Red rose of Lancaster
House of York (1461–1485)
Edward IV (1461–1483)	a Black bull of Clarence (from Lionel of Antwerp, Duke of Clarence the second son of Edward III, from which the Yorkists are also descended); a Black dragon (for the Earldom of Ulster); a White lion of Mortimer (for the Earldom of March); a White wolf of Mortimer; a Hart Argent (to reinforce his succession from Roger Mortimer, 4th Earl of March the heir of Richard II); a Falcon Argent, in a fetterlock Or (for York); a Sun in splendour; the White rose of York; a Rose en soleil (a combination of the last two badges); a Rose Gules or a Rose Gules en soleil (referring to his marriage with Elizabeth Woodville, of the Lancastrian party)
Edward V (1483)	a Falcon Argent, in a fetterlock of gold; a Rose Argent
Richard III (1483–1485)	a Boar Argent, armed and bristled Or; the White rose of York; a Sun in splendour; a White falcon with a virgin's face holding a white rose
House of Tudor (1485–1603)
Henry VII (1485–1509)	a Portcullis Or, crowned (from his mother; Margaret Beaufort); a Greyhound Argent, collared Gules (for the Earldom of Richmond); a Red dragon; a Dun cow (of Warwick); a Crowned hawthorn bush with the cypher H.R. (recalling the story that after the Battle of Bosworth Field, the crown was found under a hawthorn bush); the Tudor rose; a rose Gules, with a rose Argent superimposed, crowned; a Fleur-de-lis, Or, crowned; Flames of fire; a Sunburst; Falcon standing on a fetterlock, with a virgin's face (a harpy)
Henry VIII (1509–1547)	a Fleur-de-lis Or; a Red dragon; a Greyhound Argent, collared Gules; a Silver cock with red comb and wattles; Flames of fire; a Dun cow of Warwick; a Harp Or, stringed silver, crowned (For Ireland); a Portcullis Or, crowned; as used with motto Altera securitas; the Tudor rose; a Rose Gules, dimidiated with a pomegranate (for his first wife; Catherine of Aragon; the pomegranate is the symbol of Granada in the royal arms of the Kingdoms of Castile and Aragon); a Demi-rose Gules, impaled with a demi-roundel parted palewise Argent and Vert, charged with a bundle of arrows Argent, garnished Or (also for his first wife)
Edward VI (1547–1553)	a Fleur-de-lis Or; a Red dragon; a Greyhound Argent, collared Gules; a Harp Or, stringed silver, crowned; a Portcullis Or, crowned; the Tudor rose; a Rose Gules, crowned; a Sun in splendour
Mary I (1553–1558)	a Pomegranate (for her mother; Catherine of Aragon); a Pomegranate and rose conjoined (also used by her mother personally); a Rose Gules within a white one, impaled with a demi-roundel parted palewise Vert and Azure, charged with a bundle of arrows Argent, ensigned with a crown, surrounded by rays Or; a Winged Time drawing Truth from a Pit, with the inscription "Veritas temporis filia"; an Altar, thereon a sword erect, with the words "Arae et Regne Custodia"; the Tudor rose; a Harp Or, stringed silver, crowned; a Portcullis Or, crowned; a Fleur-de-lis Or
Elizabeth I (1558–1603)	a Falcon Argent, crowned and holding a sceptre Or (for her mother; Anne Boleyn); a Tudor rose, crowned with the motto "Rose sine Spina"; a Sieve; a Phoenix; a Harp Or, stringed silver, crowned; a Portcullis Or, crowned; a Fleur-de-lis Or
House of Stuart (1603–1649)
James I (1603–1625)	the Tudor rose; Rose Gules, with a rose Argent superimposed, crowned (for England); a Thistle, slipped and headed Proper, royally crowned (for Scotland and the House of Stuart); a Fleur-de-lis Or, crowned (for France); a Rose Gules, with a rose Argent superimposed, dimidated with a thistle in its Proper colours, crowned (for the Union of the Crowns); a Harp Or, stringed silver, crowned (for Ireland)
Charles I (1625–1649)	the Tudor rose; Rose Gules, with a rose Argent superimposed, crowned (for England); a Thistle, slipped and headed Proper, royally crowned (for Scotland and the House of Stuart); a Fleur-de-lis Or, crowned (for France); a Rose Gules, with a rose Argent superimposed, dimidated with a thistle in its Proper colours, crowned (for the Union of the Crowns); a Harp Or, stringed silver, crowned (for Ireland)
Interregnum (1649–1660)
House of Stuart (Restored) (1660–1707)
Charles II (1660–1685)	the Tudor rose; Rose Gules, with a rose Argent superimposed, crowned (for England); a Thistle, slipped and headed Proper, royally crowned (for Scotland); a Fleur-de-lis Or, crowned (for France); a Rose Gules, with a rose Argent superimposed, dimidated with a thistle in its Proper colours, crowned (for the Union of the Crowns); a Harp Or, stringed silver, crowned (for Ireland)
James II (1685–1688)	the Tudor rose; Rose Gules, with a rose Argent superimposed, crowned (for England); a Thistle, slipped and headed Proper, royally crowned (for Scotland); a Fleur-de-lis Or, crowned (for France); a Rose Gules, with a rose Argent superimposed, dimidated with a thistle in its Proper colours, crowned (for the Union of the Crowns); a Harp Or, stringed silver, crowned (for Ireland)
William III and Mary II (1689–1694)	the Tudor rose; Rose Gules, with a rose Argent superimposed, crowned (for England); a Thistle, slipped and headed Proper, royally crowned (for Scotland); a Fleur-de-lis Or, crowned (for France); a Rose Gules, with a rose Argent superimposed, dimidated with a thistle in its Proper colours, crowned (for the Union of the Crowns); a Harp Or, stringed silver, crowned (for Ireland)
William III (1689–1702)	the Tudor rose; Rose Gules, with a rose Argent superimposed, crowned (for England); a Thistle, slipped and headed Proper, royally crowned (for Scotland); a Fleur-de-lis Or, crowned (for France); a Rose Gules, with a rose Argent superimposed, dimidated with a thistle in its Proper colours, crowned (for the Union of the Crowns); a Harp Or, stringed silver, crowned (for Ireland)
Anne (1702–1707)	the Tudor rose; Rose Gules, with a rose Argent superimposed, crowned (for England); a Thistle, slipped and headed Proper, royally crowned (for Scotland); a Fleur-de-lis Or, crowned (for France); a Rose Gules, with a rose Argent superimposed, a thistle in its Proper colours, growing from the same stalk, crowned (for Great Britain, after the Acts of Union); a Harp Or, stringed silver, crowned (for Ireland)

== See also ==
- Heraldic badge
- Royal Standards of England
- Royal Supporters of England
- Queen's Beasts
- Royal Arms of England
- Prince of Wales's feathers
