= Cultural depictions of Stonehenge =

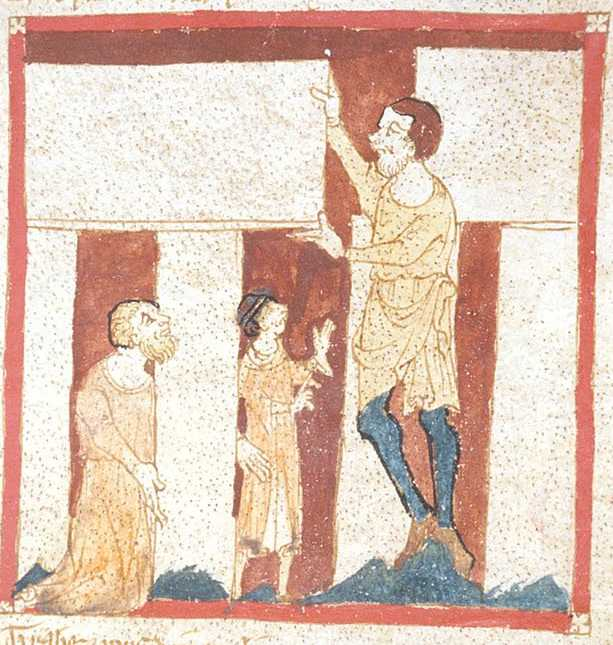
In the oldest known depiction of Stonehenge, a giant helps Merlin build Stonehenge. From a manuscript of the Brut by Wace in the British Library (Egerton MS 3028), 2nd quarter of the 14th Century AD. Belief in, and depiction of, Arthurian legend was common in this period.

The prehistoric landmark of Stonehenge is distinctive and famous enough to have been frequently referenced in popular culture. The landmark has become a symbol of British culture and history, owing to its distinctiveness and its long history of being portrayed in art, literature, and advertising campaigns; and in more recent media formats such as television, film, and computer games. This is in part because the arrangement of standing stones topped with lintels is unique—not just in the British Isles but in the world.

== Art and mythology ==
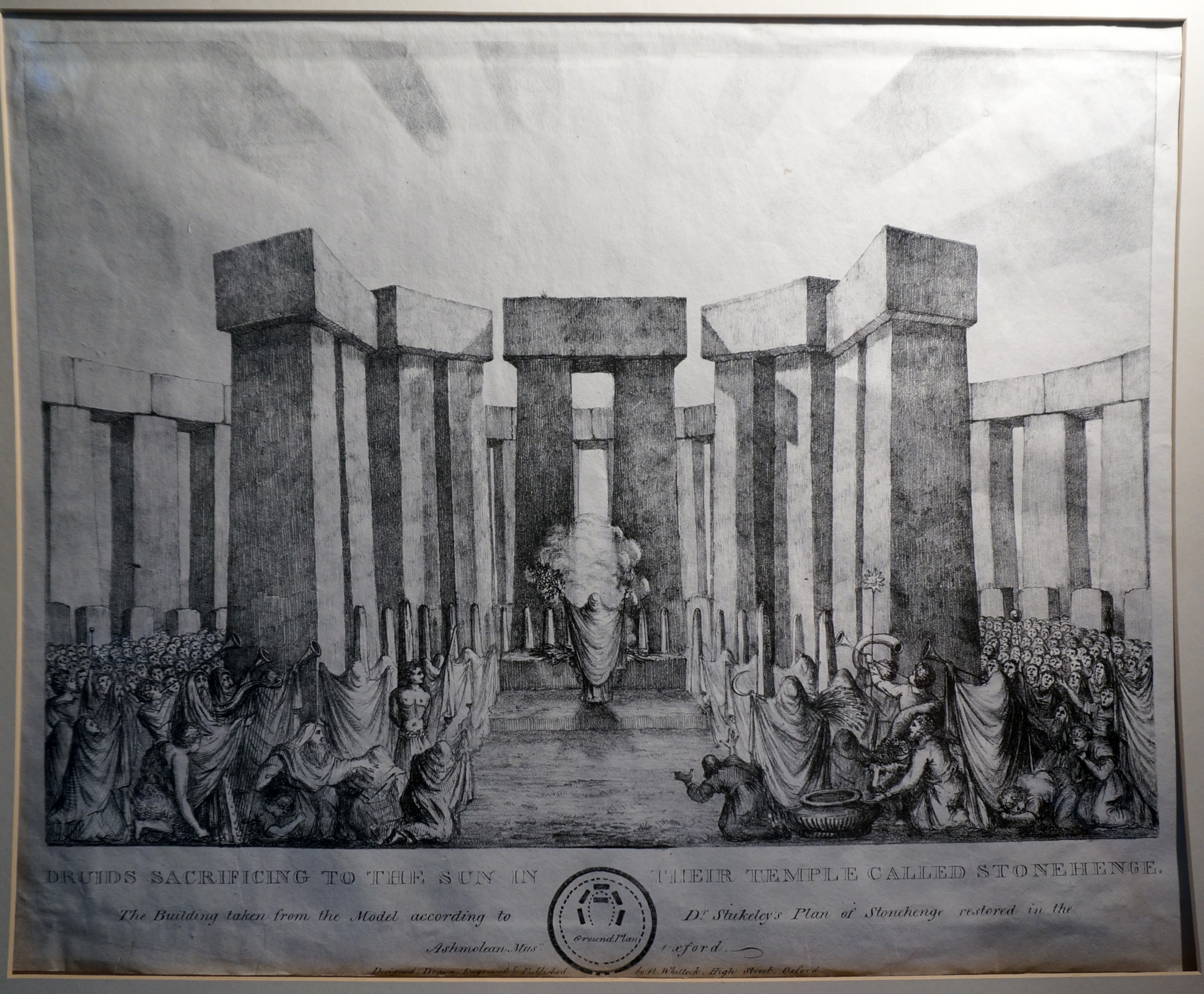
"Druids sacrificing to the Sun in their temple called Stonehenge", a 1722 engraving of the site as imagined by William Stukeley

The interest in 'ancient' Britain can be traced back to the sixteenth and seventeenth centuries, following the pioneering work of the likes of William Camden, John Aubrey and John Evelyn. The rediscovery of Britain's past was also tied up in the nation's emerging sense of importance as an international power. Antiquarians and archaeologists, notably William Stukeley, were conducting excavations of megalithic sites, including Stonehenge and the nearby Avebury. Their findings caused considerable debate on the history and meaning of such sites and the earliest depictions reflected a search for a mystical explanation.

Earlier explanations, including the view proposed by Inigo Jones in 1630, that Stonehenge was built by the Romans such was its sophistication and beauty, were disproved in the late seventeenth century, when it was proven that Stonehenge was the work of indigenous neolithic peoples. From this period onwards, artists made images of barrows, standing stones, and excavated objects which increasingly drew on highly imaginative ideas about the prehistoric people who created them. These helped to create the image of Britain that a broadening audience was becoming aware of through illustrated books, maps and prints. Poets and other writers deepened the impact of this visual material by imagining ancient pasts and mythologising the distant roots of the growing British Empire. Debates about British ancestry and national identity saw a growing conviction that the British were an ancient people and that the newly named 'United Kingdom' might find greater harmony through searching for a common past. For the English, this past was to be found in the West, starting around Stonehenge and stretching into the ancient Celtic regions of Wales and Cornwall.

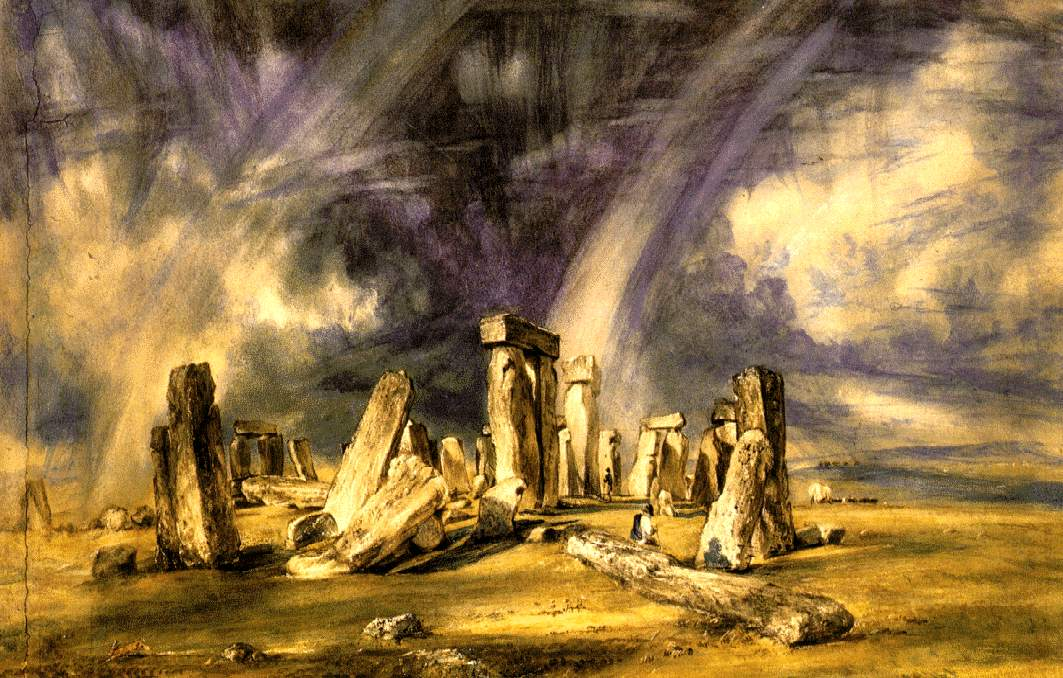
John Constable's portrayal of Stonehenge

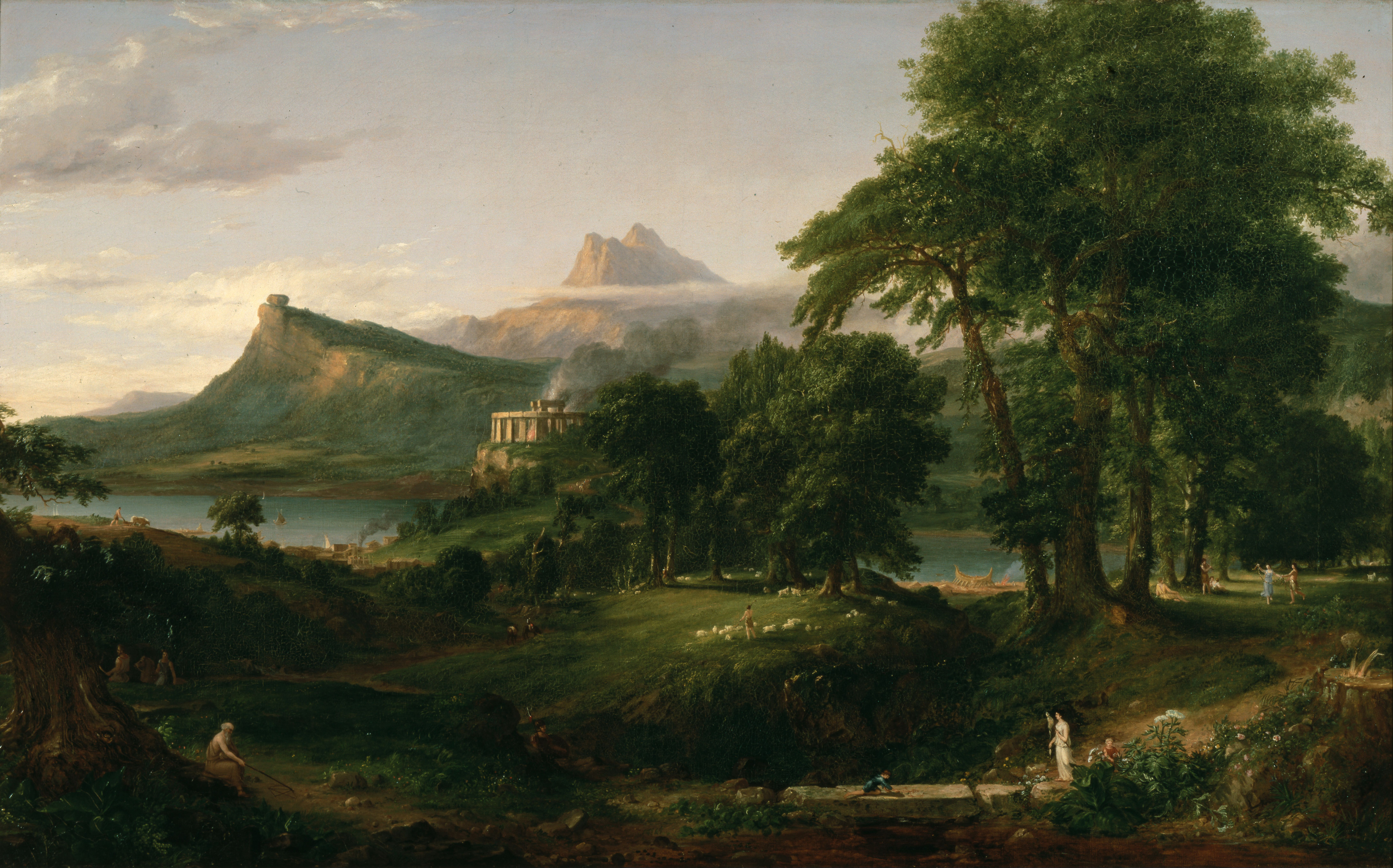
The Arcadian or Pastoral State, second painting in The Course of Empire by the Anglo-American artist Thomas Cole (1836), depicts a Stonehenge-like structure in the middle distance.

During the early nineteenth century it was artists such as John Constable and J. M. W. Turner who helped to make the megalithic sites a part of the popular imagination and understanding of Britain's past. The philosopher Edmund Burke proposed the idea of the 'sublime' sense as being evoked by 'feelings of danger and terror, obscurity and power, in art as well as life'. This was already a feature of artistic and literary works of the period and provided the theoretical basis for a growing appreciation of desolate landscapes and ancient ruins. For these reasons, Stonehenge became of particular interest for artists. Burke himself wrote

"Stonehenge, neither for disposition nor ornament, has anything admirable; but those huge rude masses of stone, set end on end, and piled high on each other, turn the mind on the immense force necessary for such a work."

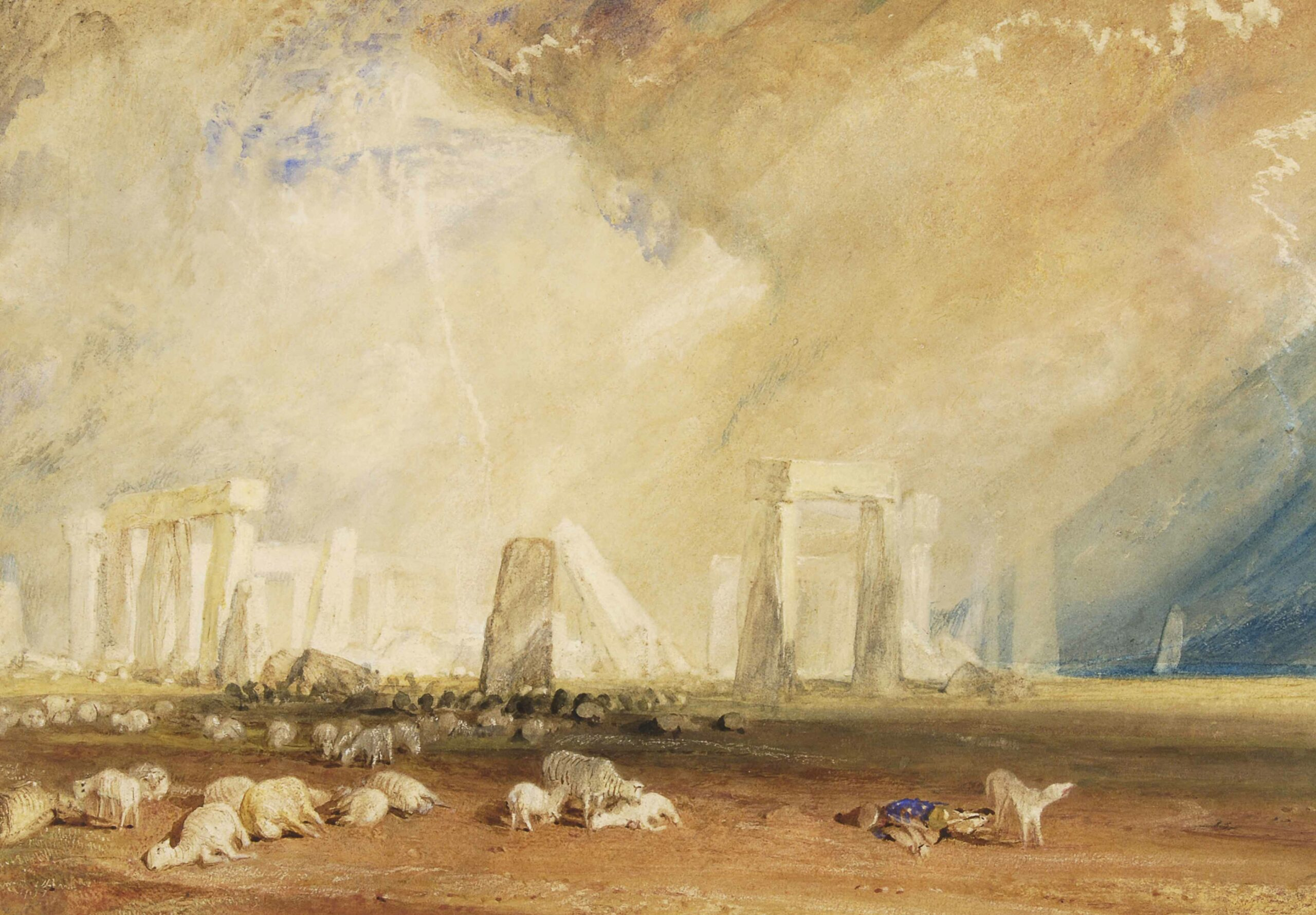
J. M. W. Turner's depiction of the monument (1825–1828)

The very nature of the barren Wiltshire landscape and Salisbury Plain became particularly notable for the apparently miraculous powers that created Stonehenge. William Wordsworth wrote

Pile of Stone-henge! So proud to hint yet keep
Thy secrets, thou lov'st to stand and hear
The plain resounding to the whirlwind's sweep
Inmate of lonesome Nature's endless year.

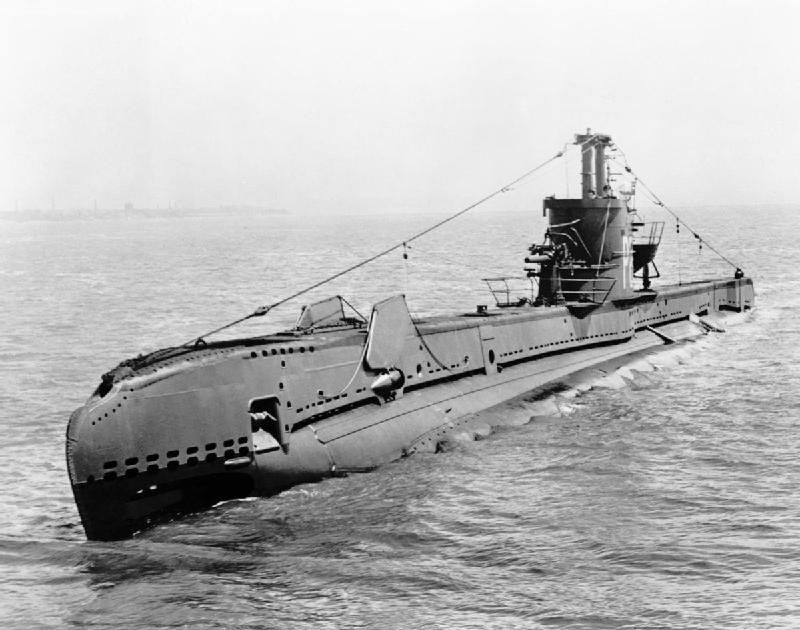
The S-class submarine HMS Stonehenge

Turner's and Constable's paintings were arranged for a romantic effect and deviated from the actual state of the stones. Turner particularly added stones that were not there in reality and those that were, were incorrect in their dimensions. Throughout the nineteenth century, a new motive emerged in the depictions of Stonehenge, that of an anti-pagan approach, with paintings by the likes of William Overend Geller, with his painting The Druid's Sacrifice in 1832. In the novel Tess of the d'Urbervilles by Thomas Hardy, the main character, Tess, is captured by the police at Stonehenge, the 'heathen' nature of the setting being used to highlight the character's temperament.

The image of Stonehenge became adapted in the twentieth century by those wishing to advertise using a monument viewed as a symbol of Britain. The Royal Navy exploited this sense of identification by naming an S-class destroyer and one of their S-class submarines HMS Stonehenge. The Shell Oil Company commissioned the artist Edward McKnight Kauffer to paint a series of posters during the interwar period, to be used to encourage tourism by car owners. Stonehenge was one of those depicted. Vivienne Westwood, the British fashion designer, uses the Stonehenge image in the Men's fashion line label.

== Comedic, commemorative, cultural and depictions in fiction ==
Stonehenge has also been depicted in less solemn contexts. In May 1970, the dance troupe Pan's People performed an opening dance on BBC's Top of the Pops to the music of Fleetwood Mac's song "Green Manalishi". The single reached number 10 in the UK singles chart. At the start of the show, the dancers performed the first fifty seconds of the sequence in the centre of Stonehenge.

At the end of Series 3, Episode 6 of the television comedy series Dave Allen at Large, first broadcast on 26 March 1973, a large polystyrene mockup of Stonehenge is depicted as a group of visitors listen to a custodian talk about its history. Dave Allen plays an unimpressed visitor smoking a cigarette who leans against one of the uprights, causing Stonehenge to topple like dominoes as the visitors run for safety.

The 1984 American mockumentary This Is Spinal Tap features a comically undersized model of Stonehenge as a prop for the titular rock group's performances.

In the 1985 American comedy film National Lampoon's European Vacation, the Griswold family win a vacation across Europe, visiting Stonehenge during the UK part of their trip. After viewing the site, Clark Griswold accidentally backs the car into an ancient stone monolith before driving off, toppling all but one of the stones like dominoes; as the tourists viewing Stonehenge are left horrified, Clark drives away, unaware of the destruction he caused.

In Season 5, Episode 2 ("The Gift Horse"), a 1997 episode of the sitcom Frasier, Frasier Crane (Kelsey Grammer) begrudgingly purchases a deluxe big-screen TV set with four surround sound speakers as a birthday gift for his father Martin (John Mahoney), in a futile effort to one-up his brother Niles (David Hyde Pierce). Upon arriving home and seeing the four tall, vertical speakers enveloping his living room, Frasier sardonically remarks, "Oh, dear God...it's Stonehenge!" in a dramatic timbre.

In 1998, Wrigleys produced a 30-second advert for the confectionary product Skittles featuring a young princess escaping from her captors and riding a white horse to a Stonehenge inspired monument. Upon arrival, she dismounts and places her hands upon a sacred stone, which releases a rainbow of Skittles.

The Doctor Who episode "The Pandorica Opens", first broadcast on 19 June 2010, was partly filmed at Stonehenge, featuring Matt Smith as the Eleventh Doctor and Karen Gillan as his assistant Amy Pond. The 2011 song "Stonehenge" by Norwegian comedy duo Ylvis features them pondering Stonehenge's mysterious origins.

As part of the 2012 Summer Olympics supporting arts festival Stonehenge was transformed into a fire garden by the French Company 'Compagnie Carabosse' for three nights 10 to 12 July. This included fire sculptures, illuminated paths and music.

On 13 June 2018, DJs Paul Oakenfold and Carl Cox played a set of Trance music to a small crowd of fifty people. Although Stonehenge was lit up with multicoloured lighting, the music was partly silent, with attendees listening through headphones. English Heritage said of the event, 'Stonehenge was used as a backdrop to this special event, and the music was not amplified at the monument. Instead silent disco technology was used and the recording was carefully planned with the Stonehenge curator to ensure there was no impact on the site.

The 2019 video game Pokémon Sword and Shield, released as part of Gen VIII of the franchise, is set in the Galar region, which is inspired by the United Kingdom. It introduces the Pokémon Stonjourner, which resembles Stonehenge, and has areas within the Wild Area that resemble and appear to be based on Stonehenge. Additionally, in Pokémon Go, Stonjourner can only be found in the United Kingdom.

In 2022, Stonehenge was illuminated to pay tribute to Queen Elizabeth II on the occasion of her Platinum Jubilee. English Heritage stated they "wanted to show different aspects of the Queen, of her personality, of her interests and just really show what a special lady she is." The display is just one of many ways in which the UK came together to mark 70 years of the Queen sitting on the throne.

In May 2023, a replica of Stonehenge was created with over 400,000 Lego bricks.

== See also ==
- Stonehenge replicas and derivatives
