= Red Rose of Lancaster =

Heraldic device used by the county and House of Lancaster

The red rose of Lancaster, the heraldic badge of the royal House of Lancaster, in its basic form

The Red Rose of Lancaster (blazoned: a rose gules) was the heraldic badge adopted by the royal House of Lancaster in the 14th century. In the modern era, it symbolises the county of Lancashire. The exact species or cultivar which it represents is thought to be Rosa gallica officinalis.

John of Gaunt's younger brother Edmund of Langley, 1st Duke of York (1341–1402), adopted the White Rose of York as his heraldic badge. His descendants fought for control of the throne of England during several decades of civil warfare, which became known as the Wars of the Roses, after the heraldry of the House of York.

Adopted after the civil wars of the fifteenth century had ended, the red rose was the symbol of the English Monarchy.

The opposition of the roses was a romantic invention created after the fact, and the Tudor arts under poets like Shakespeare gave the wars their popular conception: The Wars of the Roses, coined in the 19th century. The conflict was ended by King Henry VII of England who, upon marrying Elizabeth of York, created the Tudor rose, the symbol of the Tudor dynasty.

== Flower ==
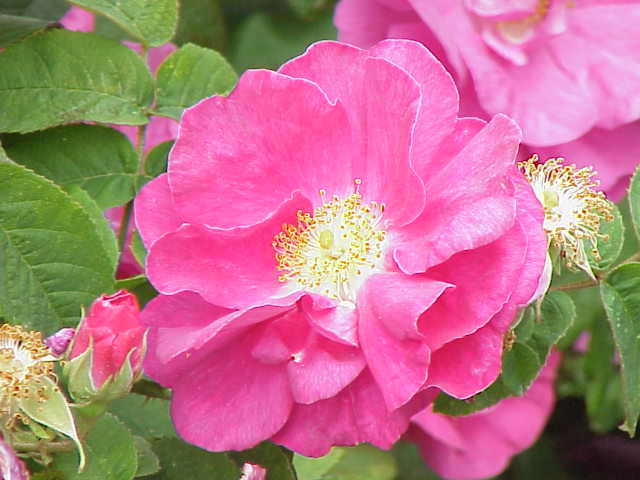
Rosa gallica var. officinalis

Lancaster's Red Rose (also known as Apothecary's Rose, Old Red Damask and Rose of Provins) is an official variety and is possibly the first cultivated rose. The rose grew wild throughout Central Asia and was discovered by the ancient Persians and Egyptians. Later adopted by the Romans, who introduced it to Gaul (France) where it assumed the name Rosa gallica. It is documented that Charlemagne's court exploited the rose as a perfume. The rose was also appreciated for its medicinal value and was utilized in countless medical remedies.

== Medieval symbol ==
The Tudor Rose of England

The Red Rose of Lancaster derives from the gold rose badge of Edward I of England. Other members of his family used variants of the royal badge, with the king's brother, Edmund Crouchback, the Earl of Lancaster, using a red rose. It is incorrectly believed that the Red Rose of Lancaster was the House of Lancaster's badge during the Wars of the Roses. Evidence for this "wearing of the rose" includes scant evidence. There are, however, doubts as to whether the red rose was actually an emblem taken up by the Lancastrians during the Wars of the Roses. Adrian Ailes has noted that the red rose “probably owes its popular usage to Henry VII quickly responding to the pre-existing Yorkist white rose in an age when signs and symbols could speak louder than words."

It also allowed Henry to invent and exploit his most famous heraldic device, the Tudor Rose, combining the so-called Lancastrian red rose and the White Rose of York. This floral union neatly symbolised the restoration of peace and harmony and his marriage in January 1486 to Elizabeth of York. It was a brilliant piece of simple heraldic propaganda.” The Tudor Rose is used as the plant badge of England (Scotland uses the thistle, Ireland uses the shamrock, and Wales uses the leek).

== Later use ==
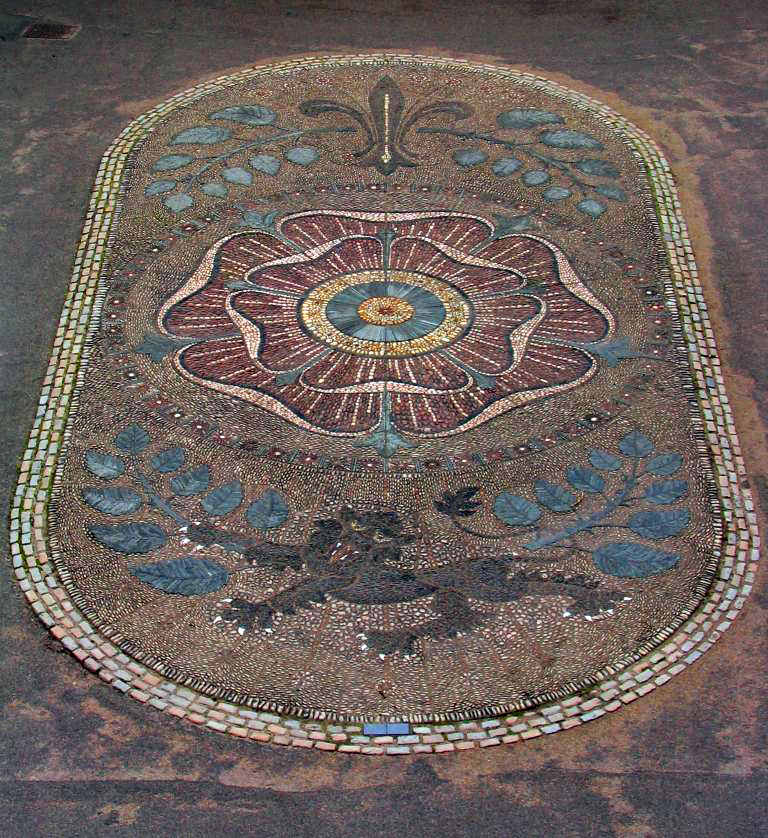
A cobblestone mosaic showing the Red Rose of Lancaster in Williamson Park, Lancaster

Lancashire's official coat of arms has three red roses

Flag of Lancashire

Unofficial flag of Lancashire with a white background, commonly flown until the adoption of the official version in 2008

The rose does not form any part of the insignia of the Duchy of Lancaster, but came to be seen as an emblem of the county of Lancashire, and as such was incorporated in the coats of arms of numerous Lancashire local authorities including the county council. Since 1974 a number of metropolitan boroughs in Greater Manchester and Merseyside have included red roses in their armorial bearings to show their formation from parts of Lancashire. It is also present in the crest of the coat of arms of the London Borough of Enfield.

The traditional Lancashire flag, a red rose on a white field, was never officially registered with the Flag Institute and when this was attempted it was found that this flag had been registered by the town of Montrose, Scotland. As two flags of the same design can not be registered, Lancashire's official flag is now registered as a red rose on a yellow field.

Today the Red Rose is still widely used, and not necessarily on a yellow background. Lancashire County Cricket Club still use the rose as an emblem. The Trafford Centre also features Red Roses in its architecture, most noticeably on all of the glass panes in the shopping centre. Lancashire GAA features a red rose on its emblem. Manchester City Football Club featured the red rose on the club badge from 1972 to 1997 and reinstated it in 2015, reflecting Manchester's history as part of Lancashire. It also features on the badges of Blackburn Rovers, Bolton Wanderers, and Barrow. Edge Hill University in Ormskirk uses the Red Rose on a yellow background on its crest along with a Liver bird which signifies its current location (Lancashire) and origins in Liverpool.

The shield of Lancashire County Council's coat of arms, however, displays not one but three red roses, on gold piles on a red background. The arms have been official since 1903.

== Military use ==
From the nineteenth century the red rose was part of the badge of a number of units of the British Army recruiting in the county. During the First World War, the rose was worn by 55th (West Lancashire) Division; their motto was "They win or die, who wear the Rose of Lancaster". When the division was reformed in 1920, it maintained the rose as its insignia. The cap badge of the Duke of Lancaster's Regiment, formed in 2006, features the rose.

The Saskatoon Light Infantry of the Canadian Army also incorporated the red rose into the design of their cap badge and regimental buttons, due to an alliance with the York and Lancaster Regiment of the British Army.

== International use ==
Flag of Lancaster, Pennsylvania

Flag of Montreal

The Canadian city of Montreal has a Lancastrian rose in the top right hand corner of its flag, representing the city's historical English community.

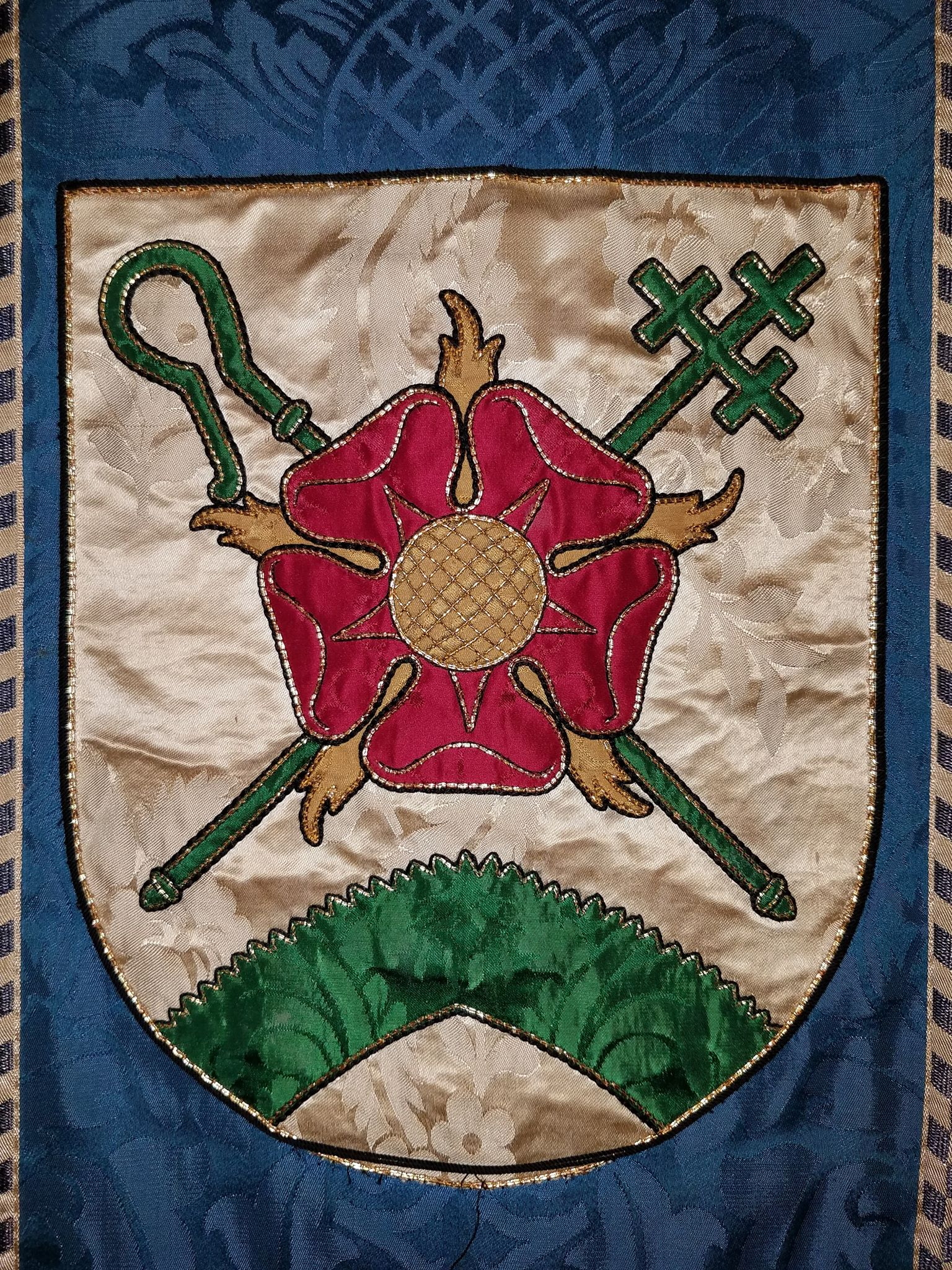
Arms of the Anglo-Catholic Church of the Good Shepherd (Rosemont, Pennsylvania), including the Red Rose of Lancaster

The U.S. City of Lancaster, Pennsylvania, known as "Red Rose City", uses the Lancastrian rose as its seal, and in its flag.

== See also ==
- Royal Badges of England
- Wars of the Roses
- White Rose of York
- Tudor rose
