= White Rose of York =

Heraldric symbol of the House of York and Yorkshire

The white rose of York, heraldic badge of the royal House of York, in its basic form, blazoned: A rose argent barbed and seeded proper

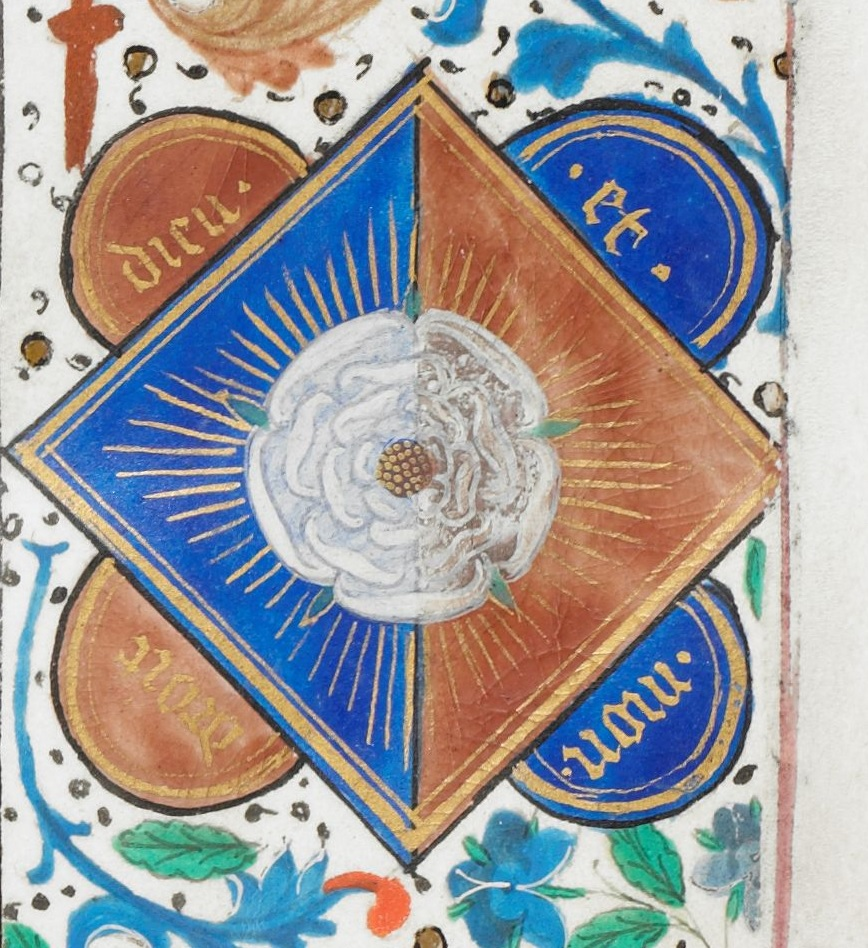
The white rose of York painted in a manuscript tempore King Edward IV (1461–1483)

The White Rose of York (Latinised as rosa alba, blazoned as a rose argent) is a white heraldic rose which was adopted in the 14th century as a heraldic badge of the royal House of York. In the modern era, it is used more broadly as a symbol of Yorkshire.

== History ==
The symbolism of the white rose has religious connotations as it represents (like the white lily) the purity of the Virgin Mary, one of whose many titles in the Roman Catholic faith is the Mystical Rose of Heaven. In Christian liturgical iconography, white is the symbol of light, typifying innocence, purity, joy and glory.

The white rose was first adopted as a heraldic badge by Edmund of Langley, 1st Duke of York (1341–1402), the fourth surviving son of King Edward III of England. One of his elder brothers, John of Gaunt, 1st Duke of Lancaster (1340–1399) adopted a red rose as a heraldic badge, red rose of Lancaster. Their respective descendants fought for control of the throne of England during several decades of civil warfare, which became known as the Wars of the Roses, after the badges of the two competing cadet royal houses.

The Tudor Rose of England

The Wars of the Roses were ended by King Henry VII of England who, upon marrying Elizabeth of York, symbolically but not politically, united the White and Red Roses to create the Tudor Rose, the symbol of the English Monarchy.

In the late 17th century the Jacobites took up the White Rose of York as their emblem, celebrating "White Rose Day" on 10 June, the anniversary of the birth of James Francis Edward Stuart in 1688.

At the Battle of Minden in Prussia on 1 August 1759, Yorkshiremen of the 51st Regiment (predecessor of the King's Own Yorkshire Light Infantry) picked white roses from bushes near to the battlefields and stuck them in their coats as a tribute to their fallen comrades. Yorkshire Day is held on this date each year.

When the body of the last Yorkist King Richard III (killed by the forces of the future King Henry VII at the Battle of Bosworth in 1485) was re-discovered buried in the City of Leicester in 2015, it was re-interred in Leicester Cathedral on 26 March 2015 with a white rose engraved on the new coffin. It was confirmed by the DNA of a woman who chose to remain private and by Michael Ibsen, both distant relatives of the king, whose DNA helped to prove his identity.

== Use in Yorkshire heraldry ==
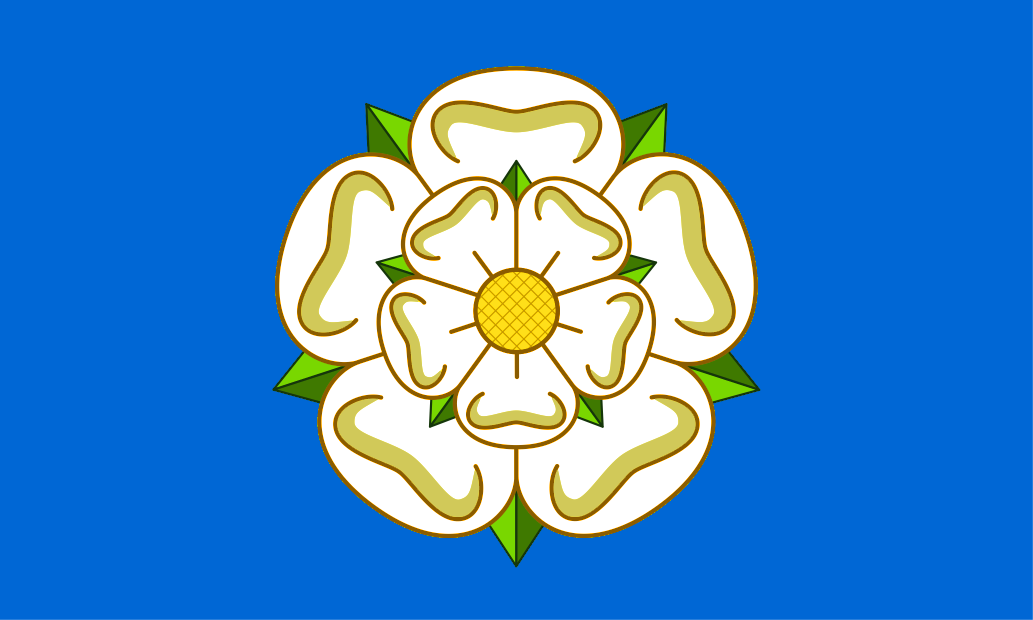
Flag of Yorkshire

The flag of Yorkshire is a White Rose on a blue background. The flags of the three ridings also display it prominently.

More than 20 civic entities in Yorkshire have a coat of arms which includes the rose of York. Including but not limited to: East Riding of Yorkshire Council, North Yorkshire Council, Barnsley Metropolitan Borough, and Bradford City Council.

In heraldry The Rose of York is blazoned as A rose argent barbed and seeded proper (a white rose with sepals and seeds in their natural colours). According to the College of Heralds, the heraldic rose may be used with either a petal at the top or if slightly rotated with a sepal at the top. Traditionally the rose is displayed with a petal at the top in the North Riding and West Riding but with a sepal at the top in the East Riding of Yorkshire.

The Yorkshire Party, a devolutionist political party with elected representatives active in Yorkshire, uses a stylised White Rose of York as their emblem.

== International uses ==
The Yorkist rose is used in the seal of the City of York, Pennsylvania, which is known as "White Rose City". The town's minor league baseball team, which played in different leagues for several decades, was called the York White Roses. The white rose appears on one of the hats for York's current minor league baseball team, the York Revolution. The hats are worn during War of the Roses games versus the Red Rose City, the Lancaster Barnstormers.

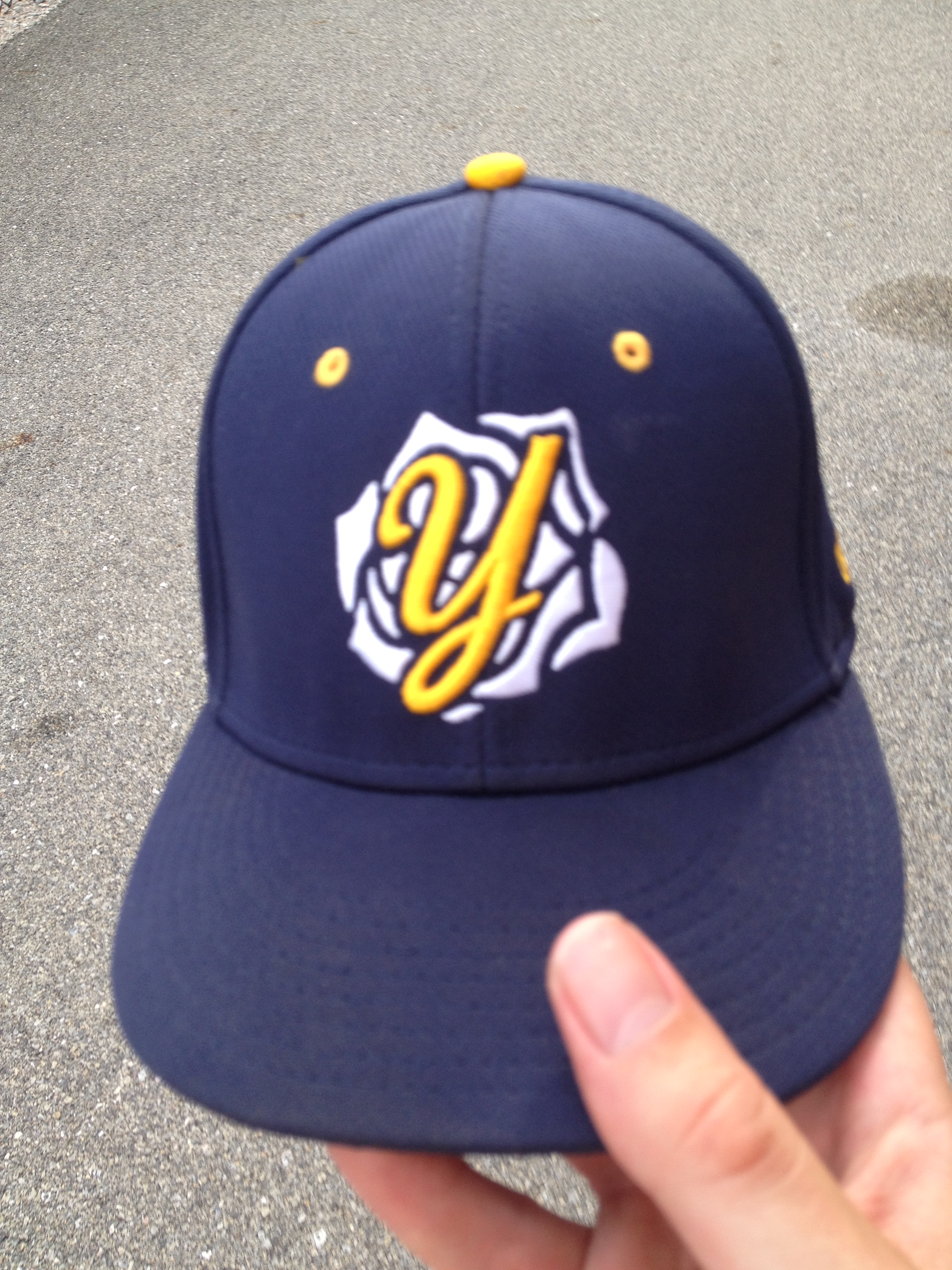
A 2016 "York Revolution War of the Roses" hat

The York Rose features on the shield of Canada's York University.

The York Rose also features in the emblem of Lenana School, a tier-one High School in Nairobi, Kenya. Lenana School was formerly known as Duke of York School.

Queens County, New York uses the Tudor rose on the county flag and was named after Catherine of Braganza, spouse of King Charles II who in 1664 sent a fleet to recapture New Amsterdam from the Dutch; The city was renamed "New York" after James, Duke of York, younger brother of King Charles II who succeeded him as King James II.

== See also ==
- Royal Badges of England
- Wars of the Roses
- Red Rose of Lancaster
- Tudor Rose
- White boar
- White rose of Lithuanian town Alytus
- Culture of Yorkshire
