= Tudor rose =

Heraldic emblem of England

The Tudor rose is a combination of the Red Rose of Lancaster and the White Rose of York.

The Tudor rose (sometimes called the Union rose) is the traditional floral heraldic emblem of England and takes its name and origins from the House of Tudor, which united the House of Lancaster and the House of York. The Tudor rose consists of five white inner petals, representing the House of York, and five red outer petals to represent the House of Lancaster.

== Origins ==
The white rose of the House of York

The red rose of the House of Lancaster

Tudor double rose royally crowned.

Tudor double rose slipped and crowned.

In the Battle of Bosworth Field (1485), Henry VII of the House of Lancaster took the crown of England from Richard III of the House of York. He thus brought to an end the retrospectively dubbed "Wars of the Roses". Kings of the House of Lancaster had sometimes used a red or gold rose as a badge; and the House of York had used a white rose as a badge. Henry's father was Edmund Tudor, and his mother was Margaret Beaufort from the House of Lancaster; in January 1486 he married Elizabeth of York to bring the two factions together. (In battle, Richard III fought under the banner of the boar, and Henry under the banner of the dragon of his native Wales.) The white rose versus red rose juxtaposition was mostly Henry's invention, created to exploit his appeal as a 'peacemaker king'. The historian Thomas Penn writes:

The "Lancastrian" red rose was an emblem that barely existed before Henry VII. Lancastrian kings used the rose sporadically, but when they did it was often gold rather than red; Henry VI, the king who presided over the country's descent into civil war, preferred his badge of the antelope. Contemparies certainly did not refer to the traumatic civil conflict of the 15th century as the "Wars of the Roses". For the best part of a quarter-century, from 1461 to 1485, there was only one royal rose, and it was white: the badge of Edward IV. The roses were actually created after the war by Henry VII.

On his marriage, Henry VII adopted the Tudor rose badge conjoining the Red Rose of Lancaster and the White Rose of York. The Tudor rose is occasionally seen divided in quarters (heraldically as "quartered") and vertically (in heraldic terms per pale) red and white. More often, the Tudor rose is depicted as a double rose, white on red and is always described, heraldically, as "proper" (that is, naturally-coloured, despite not actually existing in nature).

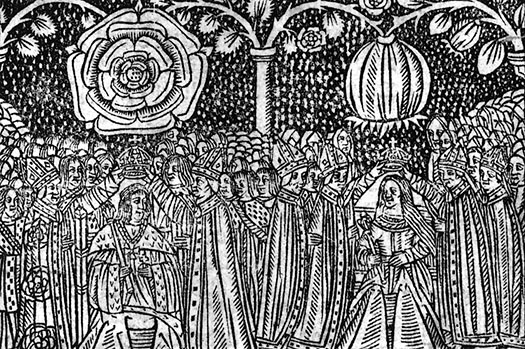
16th-century woodcut of the coronation of Henry VIII and Catherine of Aragon showing them with their respective badges: the Tudor rose and the Spanish pomegranate

Tudor rose dimidiated with the Spanish pomegranate.

Tudor rose, dimidiated with the thistle, crowned.

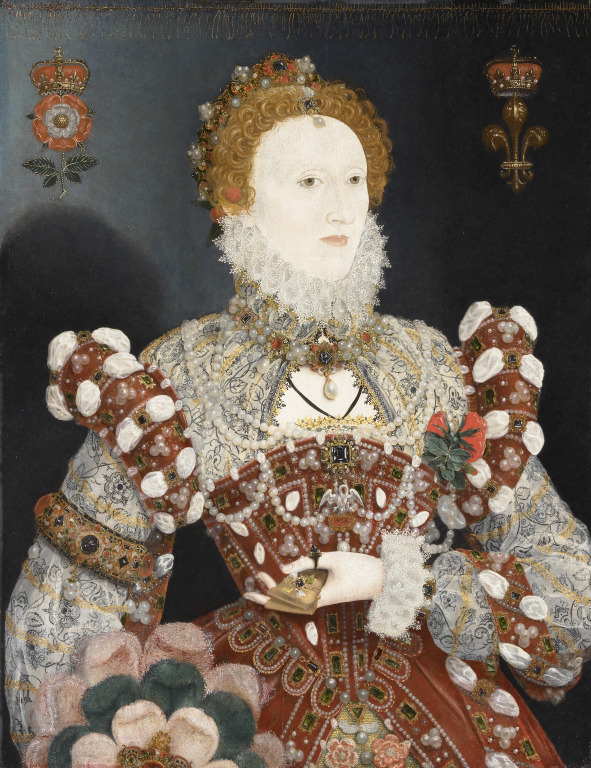
Tudor rose (upper left) slipped and crowned from the Pelican Portrait of Elizabeth I.

=== Historical uses ===
Henry VII was reserved in his usage of the Tudor rose. He regularly used the Lancastrian rose by itself, being the house to which he descended. His successor Henry VIII, descended from the House of York as well through his mother, would use the rose more often.

When Arthur, Prince of Wales, died in 1502, his tomb in Worcester Cathedral used both roses; thereby asserting his royal descent from both the houses of Lancaster and York.

During his reign, Henry VIII had the legendary "Round Table" at Winchester Castle – then believed to be genuine – repainted. The new paint scheme included a Tudor rose in the centre. Previous to this, his father Henry VII had built the Henry VII Chapel at Westminster Abbey (it was later used for the site of his tomb) and it was decorated principally with the Tudor rose and the Beaufort portcullis – as a form of propaganda to define his claim to the throne.

The Tudor rose badge may appear slipped and crowned: shown as a cutting with a stem and leaves beneath a crown; this badge appears in Nicholas Hilliard's "Pelican Portrait" of Elizabeth I and since an Order in Council (dated 5 November 1800), has served as the royal floral emblem of England.

The Tudor rose may also appear dimidiated (cut in half and combined with half another emblem) to form a compound badge. The Westminster Tournament Roll includes a badge of Henry and his first wife Catherine of Aragon with a slipped Tudor rose conjoined with Catherine's personal badge, the Spanish pomegranate; their daughter Mary I bore the same badge. Following his ascent to the English throne, James VI of Scotland and I of England used a badge consisting of a Tudor rose dimidiated with a Scottish thistle and surmounted by a royal crown.

The old iconic astronomical symbol for the asteroid 8 Flora, discovered in 1847, has been identified as the Rose of England.

=== Contemporary uses ===
The crowned and slipped Tudor rose is used as the plant badge of England, as Scotland uses the thistle, Wales uses the leek, and Ireland uses the shamrock (Northern Ireland sometimes using flax instead). As such, it is seen on the dress uniforms of the Yeomen Warders at the Tower of London, and of the Yeomen of the Guard. It features in the design of the 20-pence coin minted between 1982 and 2008, and in the royal coat of arms of the United Kingdom. It also features on the coat of arms of Canada.

As part of the badge of the Supreme Court of the United Kingdom, the Tudor rose represents England alongside the floral badges of the other constituent parts of Great Britain and Northern Ireland.

The heraldic badge of the Royal Navy's current flagship aircraft carrier HMS Queen Elizabeth uses a Tudor rose with colours divided vertically (per pale), inheriting the heraldry of the early twentieth century super-dreadnought oil-fired fast battleship HMS Queen Elizabeth. The Tudor rose makes up part of the cap badge of the Intelligence Corps of the British Army. The Tudor rose is used as the emblem of The Nautical Training Corps, a uniformed youth organisation founded in Brighton in 1944 with 20 units in South East England. The corps badge has the Tudor Rose on the shank of an anchor with the motto "For God, Queen and Country". It is also used as part of the Corps' cap badge.

The Tudor rose is also prominent in a number of towns and cities. The Royal Town of Sutton Coldfield, uses the emblem frequently, due to the town being given Royal Town status by Henry VIII. The Tudor rose appears on the coat of arms of Oxford. It is also notably used (albeit in a monochromatic form) as the symbol of VisitEngland, England's tourist board. A half-and-half design was used as the "Border Rose" in some parts of Todmorden, a conurbation that was historically bisected by the Yorkshire-Lancashire border.

The borough and county of Queens in New York City uses a Tudor rose on its flag and seal. The flag and seal of Annapolis, Maryland, features a Tudor rose and a thistle surmounted with a crown. The city of York, South Carolina is nicknamed "The White Rose City", and the nearby city of Lancaster, South Carolina is nicknamed "The Red Rose City". York, Pennsylvania and Lancaster, Pennsylvania are similarly nicknamed, using stylized white and red roses in their emblems, respectively.

There are ten tudor roses present on the crest of the England national football team.

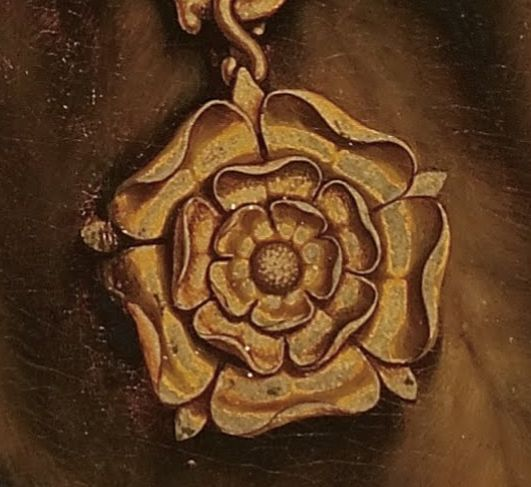
The Tudor rose used on the chain in the portrait of Sir Thomas More by Hans Holbein the Younger

Tudor rose divided per pale as the ship's badge of HMS Queen Elizabeth

Contemporary badge of the Yeomen of the Guard

Simplified Supreme Court badge used in the building's upholstery, designed by pop artist Sir Peter Blake.

== See also ==
- Flag of England
- Royal badges of England
- House of Tudor
