= HMS Stonehenge =

Two vessels of the Royal Navy have been named HMS Stonehenge after the prehistoric monument of Stonehenge.

- HMS Stonehenge (1919) was an S-class destroyer, built in 1919 and wrecked in 1920 near Smyrna.
- HMS Stonehenge (P232) was an S-class submarine, built in 1943 and lost in 1944 in the Malacca Straits.
