= Lion of England =

Lion of England may refer to the following:

- The lions in the Royal Arms of England
- The lion which appears as a supporter on the Royal Arms of England and of its successor states
- The Barbary lion, one of the national symbols of England
- British big cats, alleged big feline creatures living on the British Isles
- "Lion of England" statuary; see The Queen's Beasts
- The specific heraldic form "Lion of England"; see Attitude (heraldry) and Lion (heraldry)
- Richard Lionheart
- King Oswald of Northumbria

== See also ==
- English lion (disambiguation)
- British Lions (disambiguation)
- England Lions (disambiguation)
- The Lion and the Unicorn
- Barbary lion
- European lion
