= Cadency labels of the British royal family =

- Label and charges

Heraldic labels are used to differentiate the personal coats of arms of members of the royal family of the United Kingdom from that of the monarch and from each other. In the Gallo-British heraldic tradition, cadency marks have been available to "difference" the arms of a son from those of his father, and the arms of brothers from each other, and traditionally this was often done when it was considered important for each man to have a distinctive individual coat of arms and/or to differentiate the arms of the head of a house from junior members of the family. This was especially important in the case of arms of sovereignty: to use the undifferenced arms of a kingdom is to assert a claim to the throne. Therefore, in the English royal family, cadency marks were used from the time of Henry III, typically a label or bordure alluding to the arms of the bearer's mother or wife. After about 1340, when Edward III made a claim to the throne of France, a blue label did not contrast sufficiently with the blue field of the French quarter of the royal arms; accordingly most royal cadets used labels argent: that of the heir apparent was plain, and all others were charged. Bordures of various tinctures continued to be used into the 15th century.

== The label ==
In the ordinary system of differences a label of three points (which has also been termed a label with three files) is the distinction of the eldest son during the lifetime of his father. In the oldest rolls of arms the labels are all of five points; but labels of three points were at an early period used interchangeably. Besides being used as mere temporary marks of cadency, labels are also employed as permanent distinctions, borne (like any other charge) by every member of some particular branches of certain families. Labels are the principal cadency marks used in certain royal families. In the British royal family, all labels are argent (white). The sons and daughters of the sovereign all bear labels of three points argent; that of the arms of the Prince of Wales is plain, but all others are charged. Further descendants of princes bear labels of five points charged. All such differences should be borne on the arms, crest, and supporters.

== Charges ==
Red Cross	Rose	Heart	Fleur-de-lis blue	Anchor	Thistle	Trefoil	Red Lion	Ermine	Crown	Escalope	Bee	Roundel

The system of a special mark for difference for each member of the family goes back to the time of Henry III, whose successor, as a prince, placed such a mark on the shield of England. Since 1340 this label has almost always been white, and overlaid with small figures, or charges, such as red crosses of St George. This red cross represents England and its patron saint, and was first borne by Richard of Bordeaux (future king Richard II) before the death of his father Edward, the Black Prince in 1376. Other charges used:

- A blue anchor, a symbol of hope, or of naval service, as borne by several Dukes of York.
- The Crown of England (sometimes called the Imperial or St Edward's Crown) borne by the abdicated king the Duke of Windsor, which is as unusual as the occurrence itself.
- Roses: the Tudor Rose (combined red and white) has been used as an English royal badge since 1485.
- Red hearts may allude to the arms of Lüneburg (part of the Hanoverian arms) or – for the descendants of Edward VII and Alexandra of Denmark – to the coat of arms of Denmark.
- The blue fleur-de-lis appears amongst the Royal Badges in England of the Stuarts.
- The thistle is an ancient badge of Scotland.
- The escallop shell was traditionally a token of pilgrimage on the Way of St James. The shell in the labels of the dukes of Cambridge and Sussex alludes to those of the Spencer arms of their mother, Diana, Princess of Wales.
- The bee is a canting charge in the label of Princess Beatrice of York.
- The trefoil is a badge of Ireland, associated with St Patrick, who used it to illustrate the doctrine of the Trinity.

== Labels used since the Hanoverian succession ==
=== Examples ===
Royal Arms

The Prince of Wales

The Duke of Rothesay

Inescutcheon of the Duke of Rothesay

Albert, Prince Consort

Prince Alfred (as Duke of Saxe-Coburg and Gotha)

Prince Alfred (as Duke of Edinburgh)

Princess Beatrice

The Duke of Windsor

Mary, Princess Royal and Countess of Harewood

Prince Henry, Duke of Gloucester

Prince George, Duke of Kent

Princess Margaret

Prince William of Gloucester

The Duke of Gloucester

The Duke of Kent

Princess Alexandra

Prince Michael of Kent

The Princess Royal

The Duke of York

The Duke of Edinburgh

The Duke of Sussex

Princess Beatrice

Princess Eugenie

=== Full list ===
King George I to Queen Victoria
Name	Title	Royal Warrant	Label argent	Notes
King George I (1660–1727)	Electoral Prince of Hanover; British King from 1714.	As George was never a cadet member of the British royal family, he never had such a label.		
Ernest (1674–1728)	Duke of York and Albany, Earl of Ulster	1716		Brother of George I. Bishop of Osnabrück.
George (1683–1760)	Prince of Wales 1714			Future King George II.
Frederick (1701–1751)	Duke of Gloucester 1718, Duke of Edinburgh 1726			
Frederick (1701–1751)	Prince of Wales 1729			
Anne (1705–1759)	Princess Royal	1719		2nd child, eldest daughter of George II. Princess of Orange-Nassau.
Anne (1705–1759)	Princess Royal	1727		2nd child, eldest daughter of George II. Princess of Orange-Nassau.
Amelia (1711–1786)		1719		
Amelia (1711–1786)		1727		
Caroline (1713–1757)		1719		
Caroline (1713–1757)		1727		
William (1721–1765)		1725		
William (1721–1765)	Duke of Cumberland; 1726	1727		
Mary (1723–1772)		1727		
Louise (1724–1751)		1727		Queen of Denmark and Norway
Augusta (1737–1813)		1813		Duchess of Brunswick-Wolfenbüttel
George (1738–1830)	2nd Duke of Edinburgh, Prince of Wales 1751			Future king George III
Edward (1739–1767)	Duke of York and Albany 1760	1752		
William (father) (1743–1805)	Duke of Gloucester and Edinburgh 1764			
Henry (1745–1790)	Duke of Cumberland and Strathearn 1766			
Frederick (1750–1765)		Posthumous		
George (1762–1830)	Prince of Wales 1762			Future King George IV
Frederick (1763–1827)	Duke of York and Albany 1784			
William (1765–1837)	Duke of Clarence and St Andrews 1789	1781		Future King William IV
Charlotte (1766–1828)	Princess Royal			Queen of Württemberg
Edward (1767–1820)	Duke of Kent and Strathearn 1799			Father of Queen Victoria
Augusta Sophia (1768–1840)		1789		
Elizabeth (1770–1840)		1789		Landgravine of Hesse-Homburg
Ernest Augustus (1771–1851)	Duke of Cumberland and Teviotdale 1799			King of Hanover 1837
Augustus Frederick (1773–1843)	Duke of Sussex 1801			
Adolphus (1774–1850)	Duke of Cambridge 1801			
Mary (1776–1857)		1789		Duchess of Gloucester and Edinburgh
Sophia (1777–1848)		1789		
Amelia (1783–1810)		1789		
Leopold of Saxe-Coburg and Gotha (1790–1865)	as consort of Princess Charlotte of Wales			Later first King of the Belgians
Charlotte of Wales (1796–1817)		1816		
Queen Victoria to Queen Elizabeth II
Alexandrina Victoria of Kent (1819–1901)		No known arms were assigned to her as Princess.		Future Queen Victoria
Albert of Saxe-Coburg and Gotha (1819–1861)	Prince Consort	1837		Husband of Queen Victoria. Quartered these arms with his paternal arms of Saxony.
Victoria (1840–1901)	Princess Royal	1841		German Empress
Albert Edward (1841–1910)	Prince of Wales	1841		Future King Edward VII (1901)
Alice (1843–1878)		1858		Grand Duchess of Hesse.
Alfred (1844–1900)	Duke of Edinburgh	?		Duke of Saxe-Coburg and Gotha
Helena (1846–1923)		1858		Princess of Schleswig-Holstein.
Louise (1848–1939)		1858		Duchess of Argyll
Arthur (1850–1942)	Duke of Connaught and Strathearn	1874		
Leopold (1853–1884)	Duke of Albany 1881	1856		
Beatrice (1857–1944)		1858		Princess of Battenberg.
Albert Victor (1864–1892)	Duke of Clarence and Avondale	1890		The firstborn son of Edward Prince of Wales, died in 1892.
George (1865–1936)	Duke of York	1892		Future King George V (1910)
George (1865–1936)	Prince of Wales	1901		Future King George V (1910)
Louise (1867–1931)	Princess Royal 1905	1889		Duchess of Fife
Victoria (1868–1935)		1896		
Maud of Wales (1869–1938)		1896		Queen of Norway
Alfred of Edinburgh (1874–1899)		?		Hereditary Prince of Saxe-Coburg and Gotha
Marie of Edinburgh (1875–1938)		?		Queen of Romania
Victoria Melita of Edinburgh (1876–1936)		?		Grand-duchess of Hesse, later Grand-duchess of Russia
Alexandra of Edinburgh (1878–1942)		?		Princess of Hohenlohe-Langenburg
Margaret of Connaught (1882–1920)		1905		Crown princess of Sweden
Arthur of Connaught (1883–1938)		1904		
Alice of Albany (1883–1981)		1934		Countess of Athlone
Beatrice of Edinburgh (1884–1966)		?		Duchess of Galliera
Charles Edward of Albany (1884–1954)	2nd Duke of Albany	none	Duke of Saxe-Coburg and Gotha. Deprived of his British titles 1919. Never granted arms in right of the United Kingdom, but used the arms of Dominion of Saxe-Coburg and Gotha as was his right as its sovereign.	
Patricia of Connaught (1886–1974)		1919		Lady Patricia Ramsay
Edward (1894–1972)	Prince of Wales	1911		King Edward VIII, abdicated 1936
Edward (1894–1972)	Duke of Windsor	1937		Unique use of a Crown for an abdicated monarch.
Albert (1895–1952)	Duke of York 1920	1912		Future King George VI (1936)
Mary (1897–1965)	Princess Royal 1932	1921		Countess of Harewood
Henry (1900–1974)	Duke of Gloucester 1928	1921		
George (1902–1942)	Duke of Kent 1934	1921		
Alastair of Connaught (1914–1943)	2nd Duke of Connaught and Strathearn	1942	Quarterly 1 and 4 his grandfather's arms; 2 Fife; 3 Duff.	
Queen Elizabeth II to King Charles III
Philip (1921–2021)	Duke of Edinburgh	1947–49: his arms included an inescutcheon of his ancestor Princess Alice (Grand Duchess of Hesse): the Royal Arms with a label as shown above.		
Elizabeth (1926–2022)		1944		Future Queen Elizabeth II (1952)
Margaret (1930–2002)		1944		Countess of Snowdon
Edward of Kent (born 1935)	2nd Duke of Kent	1948		
Alexandra of Kent (born 1936)		1961		Lady Ogilvy
William of Gloucester (1941–1972)		1962		
Michael of Kent (born 1942)		1962		
Richard of Gloucester (born 1944)	2nd Duke of Gloucester	1962		
Charles (born 1948)	Prince of Wales	1958		Future king Charles III (2022)
Charles (born 1948)	Duke of Rothesay	1974		Future king Charles III (2022)
Anne (born 1950)	Princess Royal	1962		Formerly Mrs Mark Phillips
Andrew (born 1960)	Duke of York	1962/63		Andrew Mountbatten-Windsor from 2025
Edward (born 1964)	Earl of Wessex 1999; Duke of Edinburgh 2023	1983		
William (born 1982)	Duke of Cambridge	2000		The escallop is taken from the arms of his mother Diana Spencer (1961–1997).
William (born 1982)	Prince of Wales	2022		Succeeded his father to these titles in 2022.
William (born 1982)	Duke of Rothesay	2022		Succeeded his father to these titles in 2022.
Harry (born 1984)	Duke of Sussex	2002		The escallop is taken from the arms of his mother Diana Spencer (1961–1997).
Harry (born 1984)	Became a child of the Sovereign	2022		Changed to a three-point argent, each point charged with an escallop.
Beatrice of York (born 1988)		2006		Bee from the arms of her mother. The three bees are a canting of her first name.
Eugenie of York (born 1990)		2008		Thistles from the arms of her mother.

== See also ==
- Royal Supporters of England
- Royal Standards of England
