= English lion =

English lions may refer to the following:

- The lions in the Royal Arms of England
- The lion which appears as a supporter on the Royal Arms of England and of its successor states
- One of the national symbols of England, the Barbary lion
- British big cats, alleged big feline creatures living on the British Isles

== See also ==
- Lion of England (disambiguation)
- British Lions (disambiguation)
- England Lions (disambiguation)
- The Lion and the Unicorn
- Barbary lion
- European lion
