= Label (heraldry) =

Heraldic charge

Label of three points azure, as may be seen for example on the ancient arms of the Courtenay Earls of Devon

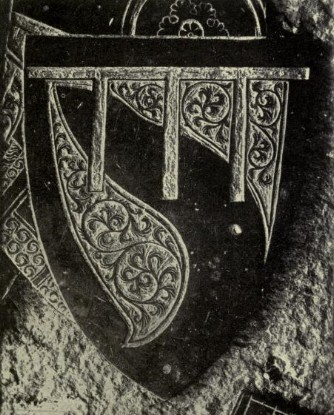
Arms of Hugh Hastings (14th century), with a label of three points for difference

In heraldry, a label (occasionally lambel, the French form of the word) is a charge resembling the strap crossing the horse's chest from which pendants are hung. It is usually a mark of difference, but has sometimes been borne simply as a charge in its own right.

The pendants were originally drawn in a rectangular shape, but in later years they have often been drawn as dovetails. The label is almost always placed in the chief. In most cases, the horizontal band extends right across the shield, but there are several examples in which the band is truncated.

== As a mark of difference ==
Label on an escutcheon

In European heraldry in general, the label was used to mark the elder son, generally by the princes of the royal house. Differencing, or cadency, are the distinctions used to indicate the junior branches (cadets) of a family.

In British heraldry, a system of specific brisures or "marks of cadency" developed: The eldest son, during the lifetime of his father, bears the family arms with the addition of a label; the second son, a crescent; the third, a mullet; the fourth, a martlet; the fifth, an annulet; the sixth, a fleur-de-lis; the seventh, a rose; the eighth, a cross moline; the ninth, a double quatrefoil. On the death of his father, the eldest son would remove the label from his coat of arms and assume the unmodified arms.

The label's number of points did not necessarily mean anything, although the label of three points was supposed to represent the heir during the lifetime of his father; five points, during the lifetime of his grandfather; seven points, while the great-grandfather still lived, etc.

According to some sources, the elder son of an elder son places a label upon a label. However, A. C. Fox-Davies states that in the case of the heir-apparent of the heir-apparent "one label of five points is used, and to place a label upon a label is not correct when both are marks of cadency, and not charges".

== As a charge ==
The label appears as a charge in the coats of arms of several families and municipalities, often having begun as a mark of difference and been perpetuated. It has also been used in canting arms. The number of pendants varies from three to seven (see examples below). There are also several examples of the pendants bearing charges, notably in the cadency labels of the British royal family.

A label of three points argent, Coat of Arms of the Prince of Wales

Arms of King Edward II whilst Prince of Wales

Arms of Saer de Quincy, 1st Earl of Winchester: Argent, a fess azure, a label of seven points gules

Arms of the lords of Fontois (or Fontoy): Or, an eagle gules surmounted by a label of four points azure

Arms of Andrew Mountbatten-Windsor, showing an anchor in the central pendant of the label.

Arms of David Armstrong-Jones, 2nd Earl of Snowdon whilst Viscount Linley: Quarterly 1st & 4th, the arms of his father The Earl of Snowdon with a label vert, 2nd & 3rd the arms of his mother The Princess Margaret whose label argent is charged with roses and a thistle

Arms of Olivier IV de Rohan seigneur de Montauban, showing three pendants beginning at the chief line of the shield

Arms of Beaufort, Luxembourg, an example of a truncated label

Arms of the département of Pas-de-Calais, based on the arms of the county of Artois. The label terminates at the bordure and is charged with castles Or.

Arms of the Duke of Gloucester

Arms of the Duke of Norfolk

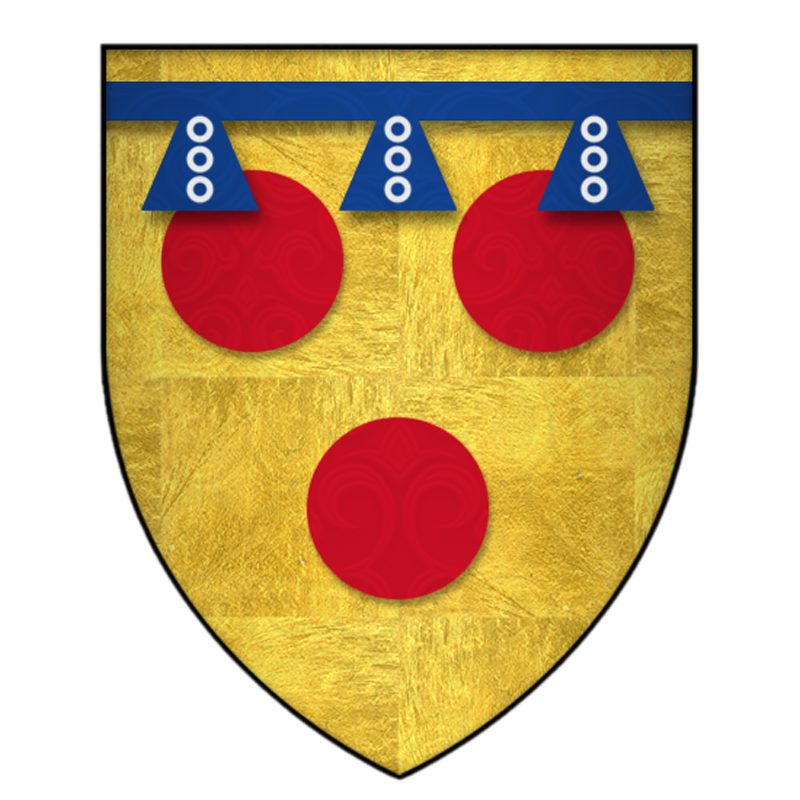
Arms of Courtenay

Arms of Lord Mowbray, Segrave & Stourton

Arms of the Count of Anjou

== See also ==
Fillet (heraldry)
