= British Lions =

British Lion or British Lions may refer to:

- British Lion, a national symbol of Great Britain

== Sport ==
- British & Irish Lions, a touring side playing rugby union, known until 2001 as the British Lions
- Great Britain national rugby league team, nicknamed "The Lions"

== Media ==
- British Lions (band), British rock band with former members of Mott the Hoople and Medicine Head, active 1977–1980
- British Lions (album), a 1978 debut album by the band of the same name
- British Lion (album), a 2012 album by Steve Harris
- British Lion (band), British band formed by Steve Harris
- British Lion Films, British film production company and distributor

== See also ==
- British big cats, alleged big feline creatures living on the British Isles
- English lion (disambiguation)
- Scottish lion (disambiguation)
- The Lion and the Unicorn
- History of lions in Europe
