= Yale (mythical creature) =

Beast in European mythology and heraldry

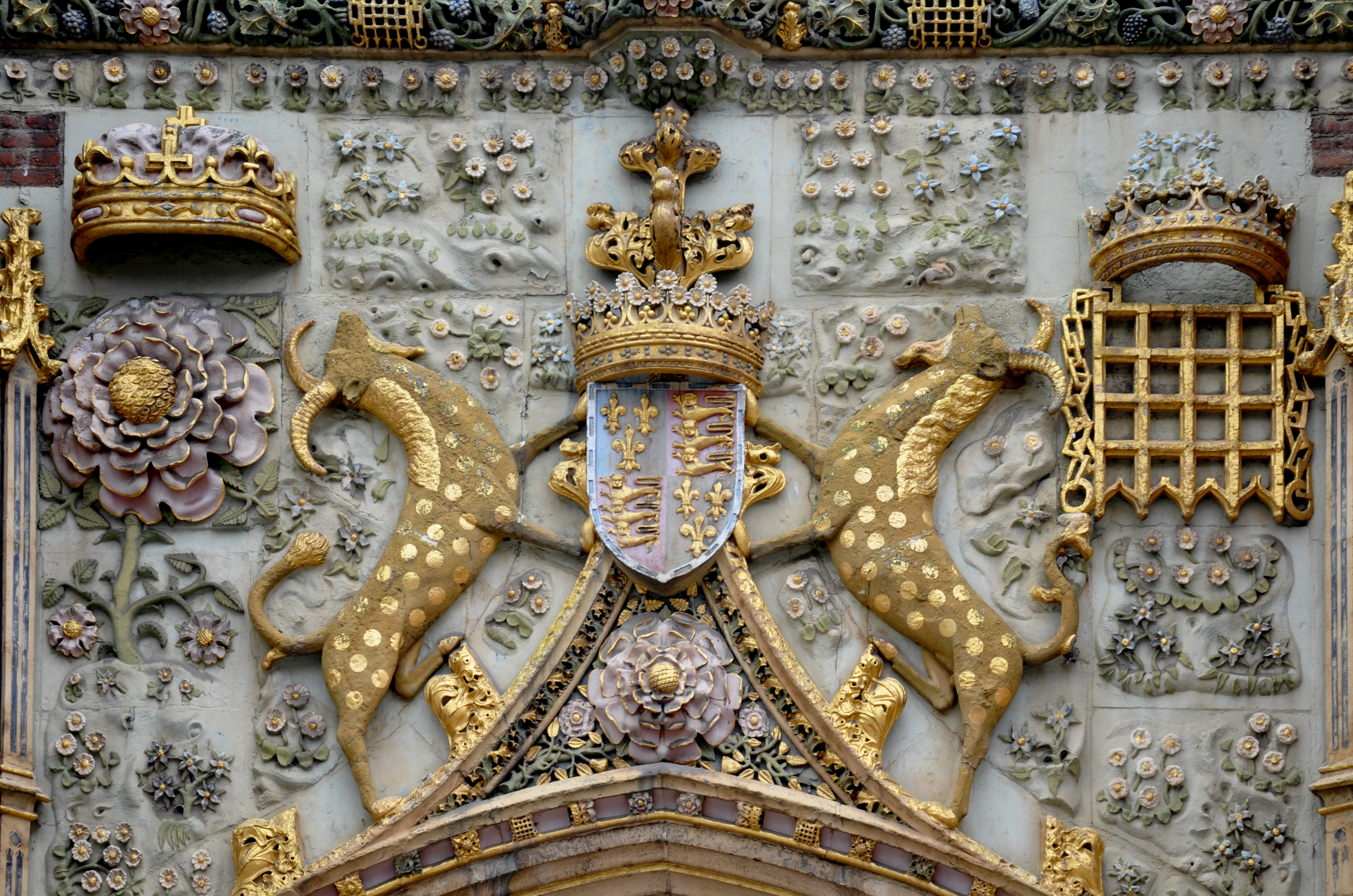
Yales serving as supporters above the gate of St John's College, Cambridge

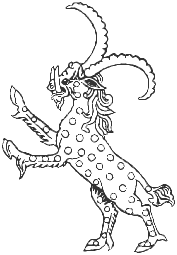
Heraldic yale

The yale or centicore (Latin: eale) is a mythical beast found in European mythology and heraldry.

== Etymology ==
The name "yale" is believed to be derived from the Hebrew word יָעֵל (yael), meaning "ibex". Other common names are "eale" or "centicore". The Septuagint translation of Job 39:1 rendered the word יָעֵל as τραγελάφων (trageláphōn), which referred to the mythical tragelaphus, a half-goat half-stag, which in 1816 gave its name to a genus of antelope Tragelaphus.

== Description ==
The yale is described as an antelope- or goat-like creature with the tusks of a boar and large horns. These horns possess the ability to swivel in any direction which makes them good for both offensive and defensive attacks.

The yale was first written about by Pliny the Elder in Book VIII of his Natural History. He describes the eale as a creature found in Aethiopia:

it is the size of the river-horse, has the tail of the elephant, and is of a black or tawny colour. It has also the jaws of the wild boar, and horns that are moveable, and more than a cubit in length, so that, in fighting, it can employ them alternately, and vary their position by presenting them directly or obliquely, according as necessity may dictate.

Pliny reports sighting the yale while on the sub-Saharan African plains. The antelope and buffalo inhabit this region and loosely match his description, so may have given rise to his misunderstanding.

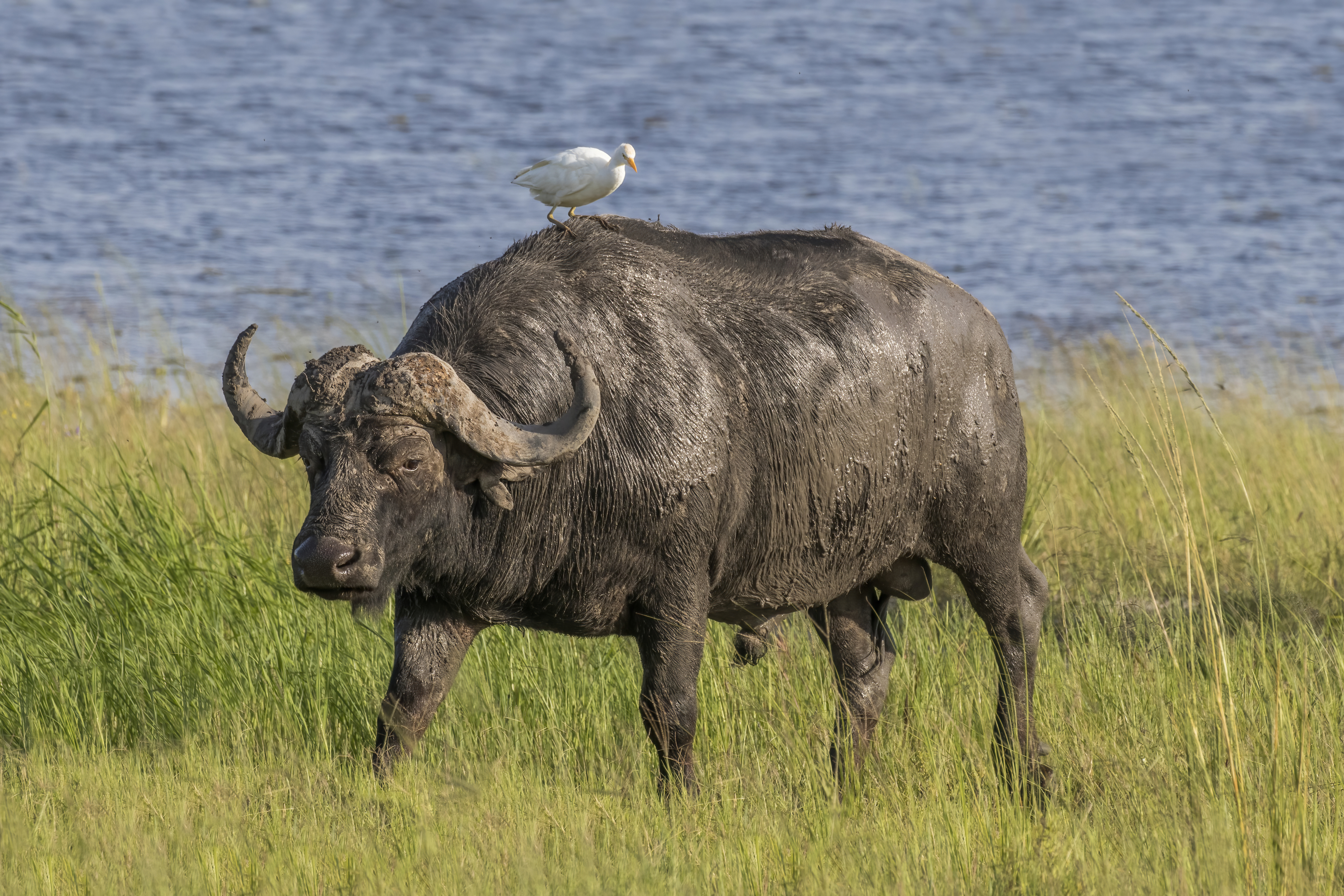
African buffalo

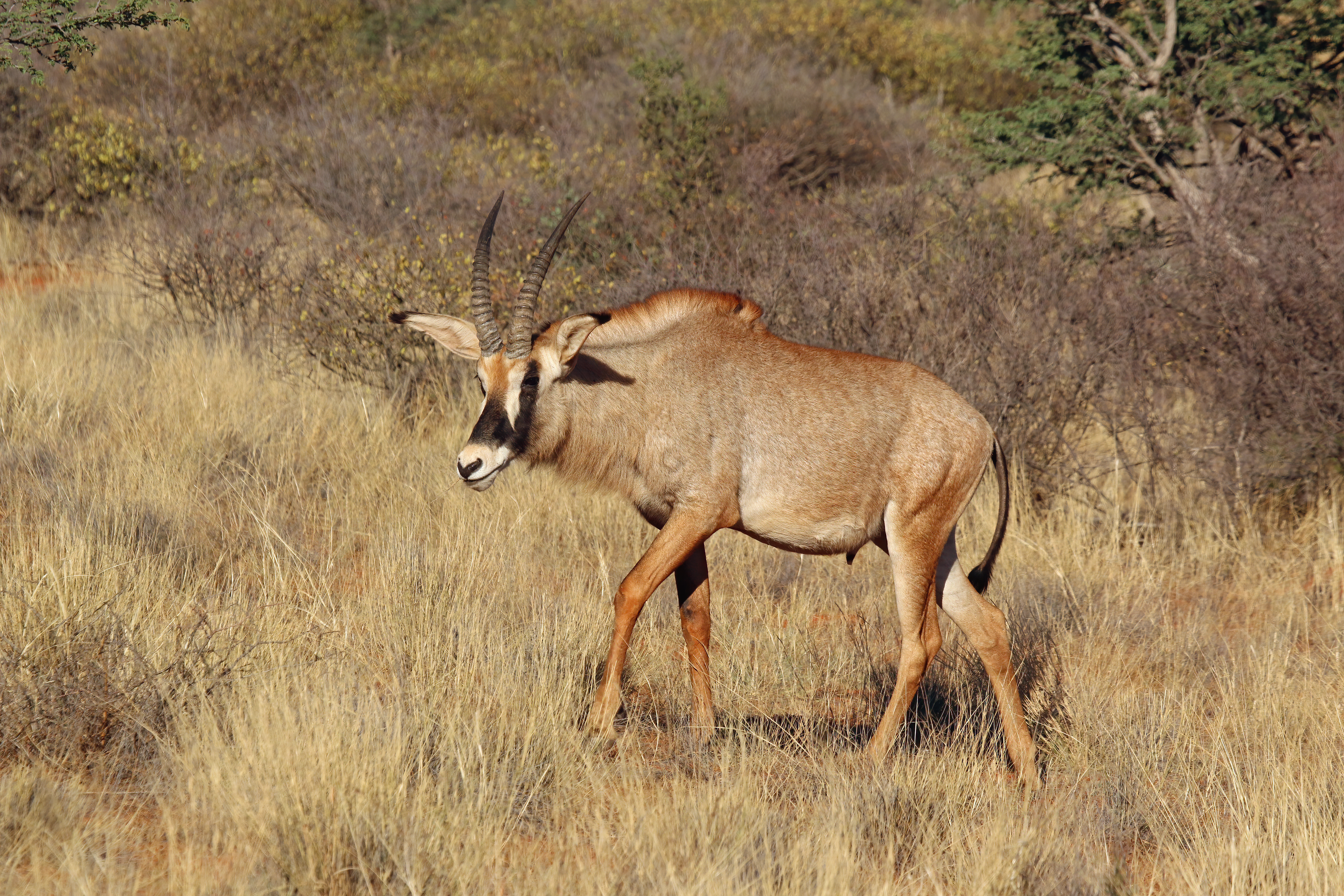
Roan antelope

The yale subsequently featured in medieval bestiaries and heraldry.

== Heraldry ==
Arms of Lady Margaret Beaufort, with Yales as supporters. From Christ's College Book of Donors, 1623

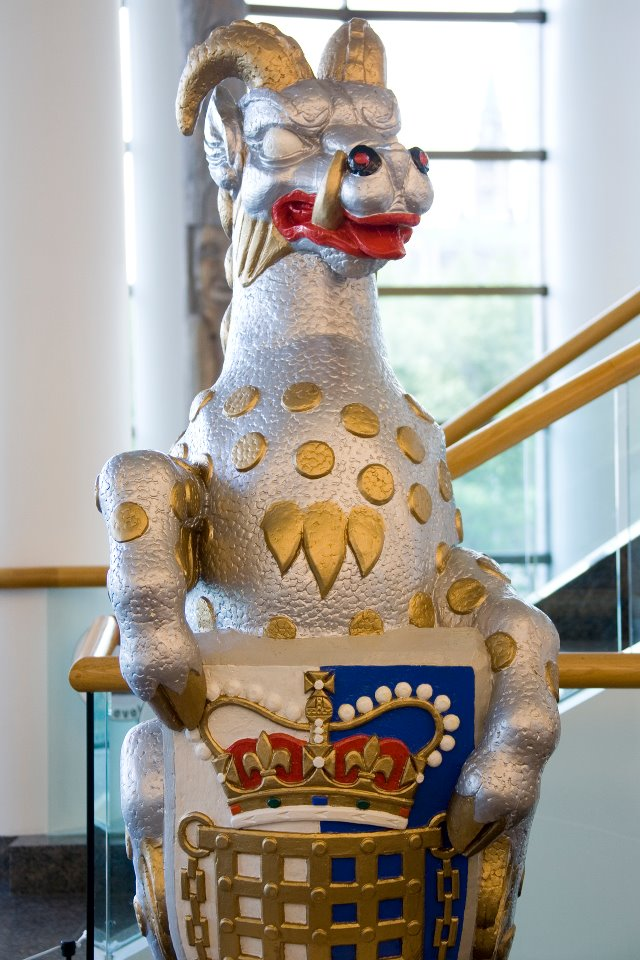
The yale as one of the Queen's Beasts

The yale is among the heraldic beasts used by the British royal family. It was used as a supporter for the arms of John, Duke of Bedford, and by England's House of Beaufort. Its connection with the British monarchy began with Henry VII in 1485. Henry Tudor’s mother, Lady Margaret (1443–1509), was a Beaufort, and the Beaufort heraldic legacy inherited by both her and her son included the yale.

Lady Margaret Beaufort was a benefactor of Cambridge's Christ's College and St John's College, and her yale can be seen on the college gatehouses. There are also a pair on the roof of St George's Chapel in Windsor Castle. The Yale of Beaufort was one of the Queen's Beasts commissioned for the coronation of Elizabeth II in 1953: the plaster originals are in Canada, while stone copies are at Kew Gardens, outside the palm house.

In the US, the yale is associated with Yale University in New Haven, Connecticut. Although the school's primary sports mascot is a bulldog named Handsome Dan, the yale can be found throughout the university campus. The mythical beast occupies two quadrants of the coat of arms of the Yale Faculty of Arts and Sciences (FAS). The yale is also depicted on the official banner of the president of the university, which, along with a wooden mace capped by a yale's head, is carried and displayed during commencement exercises each spring. Yales can also be seen above the gateway to Yale's Davenport College and the pediment of Timothy Dwight College.
