= The Queen's Beasts =

Heraldic sculptures by James Woodford

Coordinates: 45.430558°N 75.708907°W

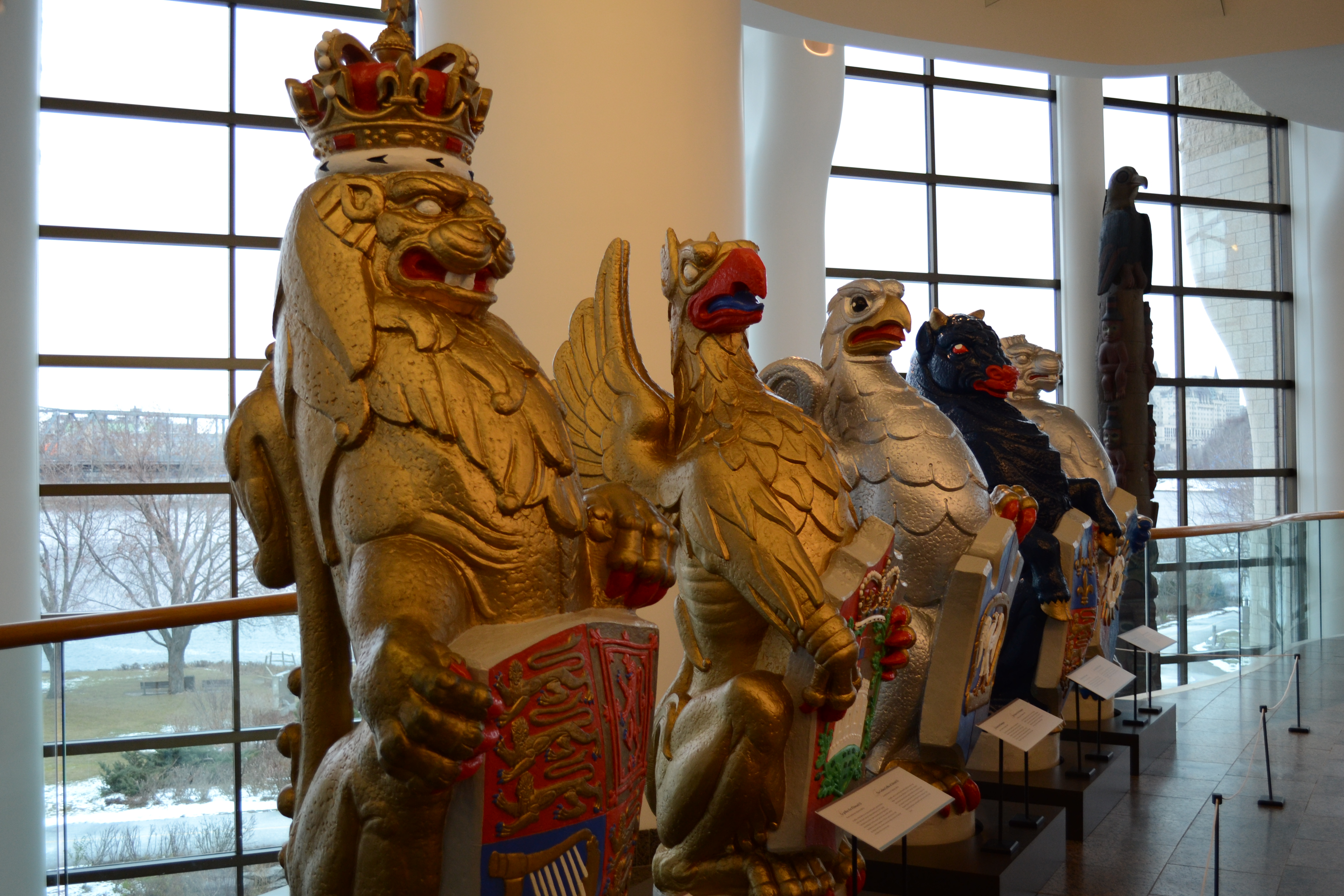
The original Queen's Beasts in the Canadian Museum of History.

The Queen's Beasts are ten heraldic statues representing the genealogy of Queen Elizabeth II, depicted as the Royal supporters of England plus the Welsh Dragon, the Unicorn of Scotland and the White Horse of Hanover. They stood in front of the temporary western annexe to Westminster Abbey for the Queen's coronation in 1953. Each of the Queen's Beasts consists of a heraldic beast supporting a shield bearing a badge or arms of a family associated with the ancestry of Queen Elizabeth II. They were commissioned by the British Ministry of Works from the sculptor James Woodford, who was paid the sum of £2,750 for the work. They were uncoloured except for their shields at the coronation. They are now on display in the Canadian Museum of History in Gatineau, Quebec.

The original models are the King's Beasts which survive at Hampton Court Palace near London, sculpted in stone for King Henry VIII (1509–1547) and his third wife Jane Seymour. Copies survive at nearby Kew Gardens. In the 1920s a set of 76 similar heraldic beasts was replaced on the roof of St George's Chapel, Windsor Castle, having been taken down in 1682 due to dilapidation.

== Origins ==
There are ten heraldic beasts at Hampton Court Palace near London. They were restored at the beginning of the twentieth century but were derived from originals made in 1536/7 for King Henry VIII and his third wife Jane Seymour (d.1537), and are known as the "King's Beasts". They are carved in stone and each sits erect, supporting a shield upon which there is a coat of arms or a heraldic badge. From the beasts themselves and the emblems which they carry on their shields, it is evident that they stood for King Henry and his third Queen, Jane Seymour.

In the autumn of 1952, the Minister of Works, in preparation for the coronation some months ahead, called upon the Royal Academician and sculptor James Woodford, to create ten new beasts similar in form and character to the ten at Hampton Court but more particularly, appropriate to the Queen. Exact replicas of those at Hampton Court would have been unsuitable for the occasion, for some of them would have little connection with Elizabeth II's own family or ancestry, as, although the Queen is descended (via female lines) from King Henry VII (the father of King Henry VIII), (Note: Elizabeth II is descended from Henry VIII's sister, Queen Margaret of Scotland, the grandmother of Mary, Queen of Scots. Mary's son, James VI & I had a daughter, Elizabeth who married Frederick V of the Palatinate. Under the Act of Settlement 1701, only the legitimate Protestant descendants of Frederick and Elizabeth's daughter Sophia, Electress of Hanover, may inherit the throne of the United Kingdom, and all British monarchs since George I are descendants of Sophia.) she is not descended from Jane Seymour whose only son King Edward VI died unmarried.

== Characteristics ==
The beasts are about six feet (1.8 m) high and weigh about 700 pounds (320 kg) each. They are made from plaster, so cannot be left exposed permanently to the elements. Originally uncoloured except for their shields, they are now fully painted.

== Display at the coronation ==
The Beasts were on display outside the western annexe of Westminster Abbey, a glass-fronted structure in which to marshal the long processions before the service. The statues were placed along the front with the exception of the Lion of England which was placed in the alcove formed by the north wall of the annexe and the entrance used by the Queen to enter the Abbey on her arrival in the Gold State Coach. The statues were placed left to right in the following order when facing the annexe from the west: The Lion of England, the greyhound, the yale, the dragon, the horse, the lion of Mortimer, the unicorn, the griffin, the bull, and the falcon. This was not the same order as they relate to the royal pedigree, but were ordered in this way for balance and symmetry in display. The Scottish Unicorn, Horse of Hanover, Griffin and Falcon replace four of the Beasts at Hampton Court (Seymour Black Lion, Seymour colour-spotted Panther & Seymour Unicorn and either the so-called Tudor Dragon or the Royal Dragon).

Molly Guion painted the Beasts in 1953.

== Relocations ==
After the coronation they were removed to the Great Hall in Hampton Court Palace. In 1957 they were moved again to St George's Hall, Windsor. The beasts were taken into storage in April 1958 while their future was considered. It was eventually decided to offer them to the Commonwealth governments; Canada, being the senior nation, was offered them first. In June 1959 the Canadian government accepted the beasts and they were shipped there in July. Originally the only coloured parts of the statues were their heraldic shields, but for the celebrations of the Centennial of Canadian Confederation in 1967, the statues were painted in their full heraldic colours. They are now in the care of the Canadian Museum of History in Gatineau.

== Replicas ==
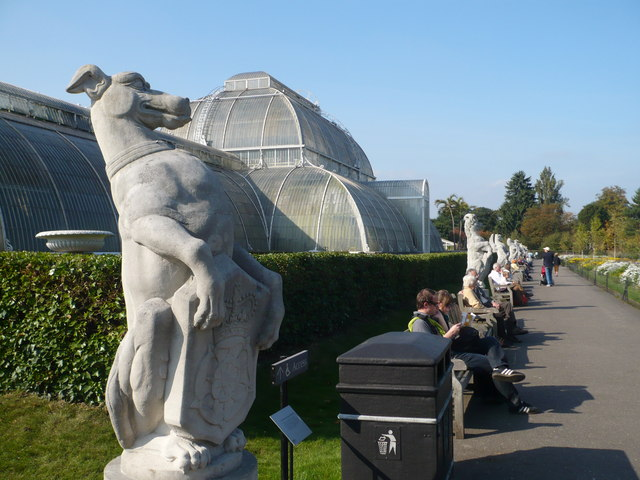
Portland stone replicas of the Queen's Beasts in Kew Gardens, London

In 1958 Sir Henry Ross, Chairman of the Distillers Company in Edinburgh, paid for Portland stone replicas of the statues to be made, which are on display outside the Palm House at Kew Gardens. The beasts also served as models for topiary at Hall Place, Bexley. The original sculptures have been commemorated in the following forms: bone china figurines, cups and saucers, glass tray sets, plaster models, reclaimed material reproductions, porcelain candlesticks, British postage stamps issued in 1998, silver teaspoons, and tea towels. In 2016 the Royal Mint launched a series of ten Queen's Beasts coins, one for each beast.

== Historical explanations ==
=== The Lion of England ===

The Lion of England is the crowned golden lion of England, which has been one of the supporters of the Royal Arms since the reign of Edward IV (1461–1483). It supports a shield showing the Arms of the United Kingdom as they have been since Queen Victoria's accession in 1837. In the first and last quarters of the shield are the arms of the House of Plantagenet (the "Lions of England", technically in heraldic language "Leopards of England"), taken from the arms of Richard I (1157–1199), "The Lionheart". The lion and tressure (armorial border) of Scotland appear in the second, and the Harp of Ireland is in the third.

=== The White Greyhound of Richmond ===

The White Greyhound of Richmond was a badge of John of Gaunt, 1st Duke of Lancaster, Earl of Richmond, third son of Edward III. It was also used by his son Henry IV and especially by Henry VII. The Tudor double rose can be seen on the shield, one rose within another surmounted by a crown. It symbolizes the union of the two cadet houses of Plantagenet – the House of York and the House of Lancaster.

=== The Yale of Beaufort ===

The Yale was a mythical beast, supposedly white and covered with gold spots and able to swivel each of its horns independently. It descends to the Queen through Henry VII, who inherited it from his mother, Lady Margaret Beaufort. The shield shows a portcullis surmounted by a royal crown. The portcullis (uncrowned) was a Beaufort badge, but was used both crowned and uncrowned by Henry VII.

=== The Red Dragon of Wales ===

The red dragon (Welsh: Y Ddraig Goch) is an ancient Welsh symbol, and a badge used by Owen Tudor. His grandson, Henry VII, claimed descent from Cadwaladr, the last of the line of Maelgwn whose association with the dragon came after Henry's reign. The beast holds a shield bearing a lion in each quarter; this was the coat of arms of Llywelyn ap Gruffudd, the last native Prince of Wales.

=== The White Horse of Hanover ===

The White Horse of Hanover, or Saxon Steed, was introduced into the Royal Arms in 1714 when the crown of Great Britain passed to the Elector George of Hanover. This grandson of Elizabeth Stuart, sister of Charles I, became George I, King of Great Britain and Ireland. The shield shows the leopards of England and the lion of Scotland in the first quarter, the fleur-de-lis of France in the second (brought into the royal arms of England by King Edward II) and the Irish harp in the third quarter. The fourth quarter shows the arms of Hanover.

=== The White Lion of Mortimer ===

The White Lion of Mortimer descends to the Queen through Edward IV, from Anne de Mortimer. The shield shows a white rose encircled by a golden sun, known heraldically as a 'white rose en soleil' which is really a combination of two distinct badges. Both of these appear on the Great Seals of Edward IV and Richard III, and were used by George VI when Duke of York. Unlike the Lion of England, this beast is uncrowned.

=== The Unicorn of Scotland ===

From the end of the 15th century, two unicorns were adopted as the supporters of the Scottish Royal Arms. In 1603 the crown of England passed to James VI of Scotland, who then became James I of England. He took as supporters of his royal arms a crowned lion of England and one of his Scottish unicorns. The unicorn holds a shield showing the royal arms of Scotland, a lion rampant within a double tressure flory-counter-flory.

=== The Griffin of Edward III ===

The griffin of Edward III Queen's Beast is an ancient mythical beast. It was considered a beneficent creature, signifying courage and strength combined with guardianship, vigilance, swiftness and keen vision. It was closely associated with Edward III who engraved it on his private seal. The shield shows the Round Tower of Windsor Castle (where Edward III was born) with the Royal Standard flying from the turret, enclosed by two branches of oak surmounted by the royal crown.

=== The Black Bull of Clarence ===

The Black Bull of Clarence descended to the Queen through Edward IV. The shield shows the Royal Arms as they were borne by Edward IV and his brother Richard III as well as all the sovereigns of the Houses of Lancaster and Tudor.

=== The Falcon of the Plantagenets ===

The falcon was first used by Edward III of the House of Plantagenet as his badge. It descended to Edward IV, who took it as his personal badge, the falcon standing within an open fetterlock. Originally closed, the slightly open fetterlock is supposed to refer to the struggle Edward IV had to obtain the throne — "he forced the lock and won the throne."

== Gallery ==
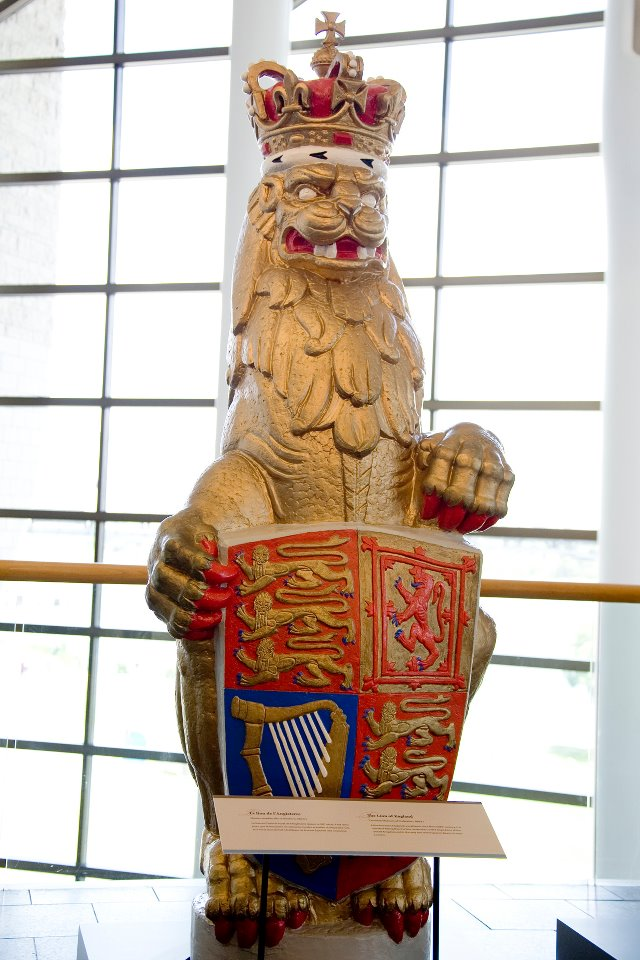
Lion of England

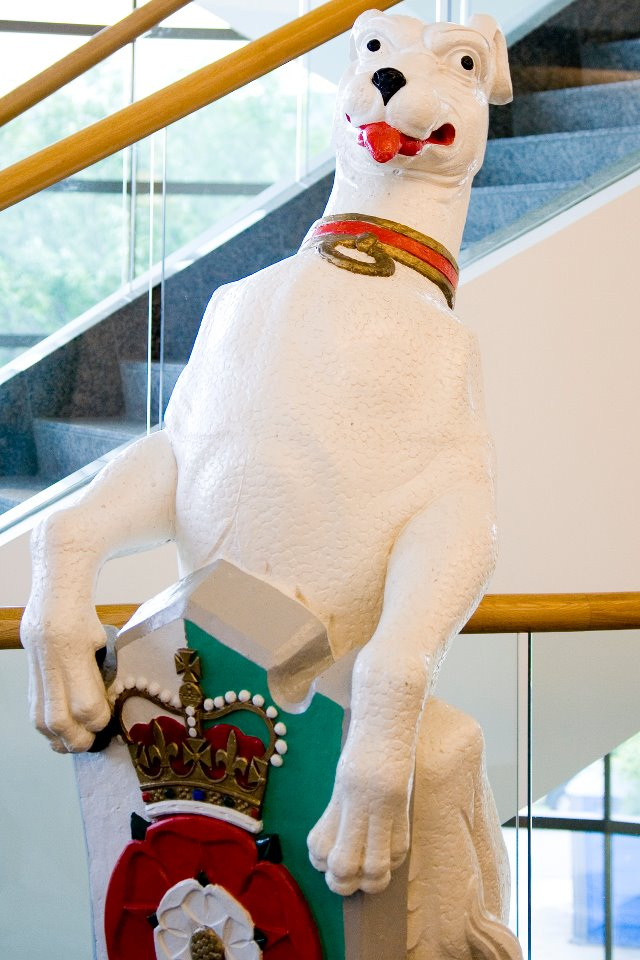
White Greyhound of Richmond

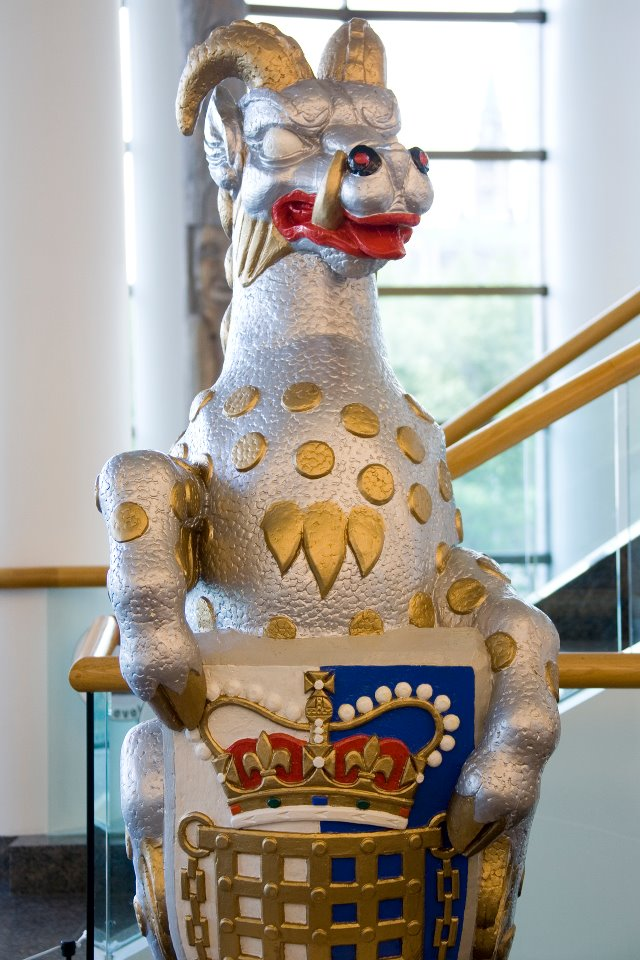
Yale of Beaufort

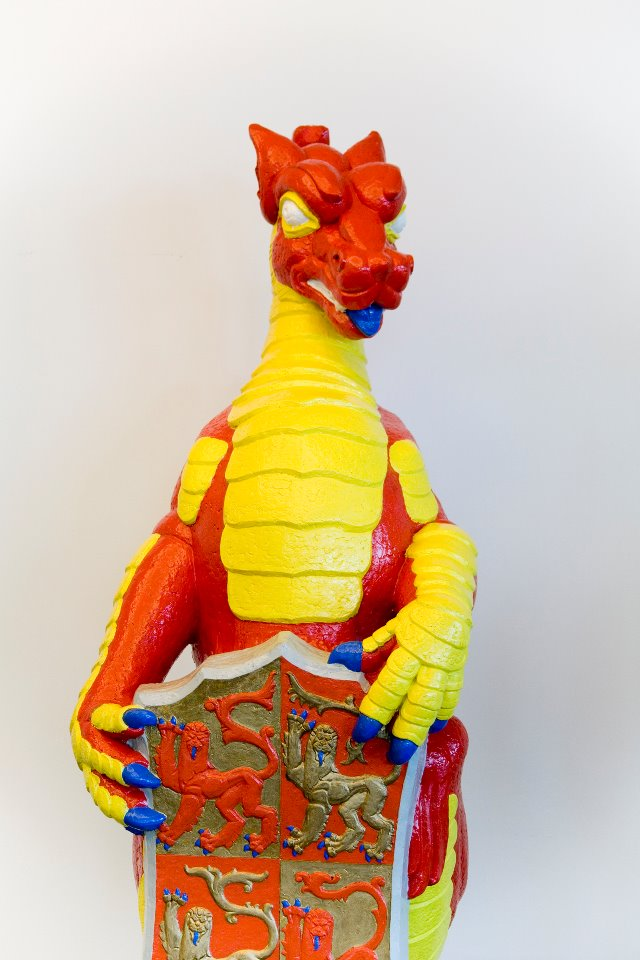
Red Dragon of Wales

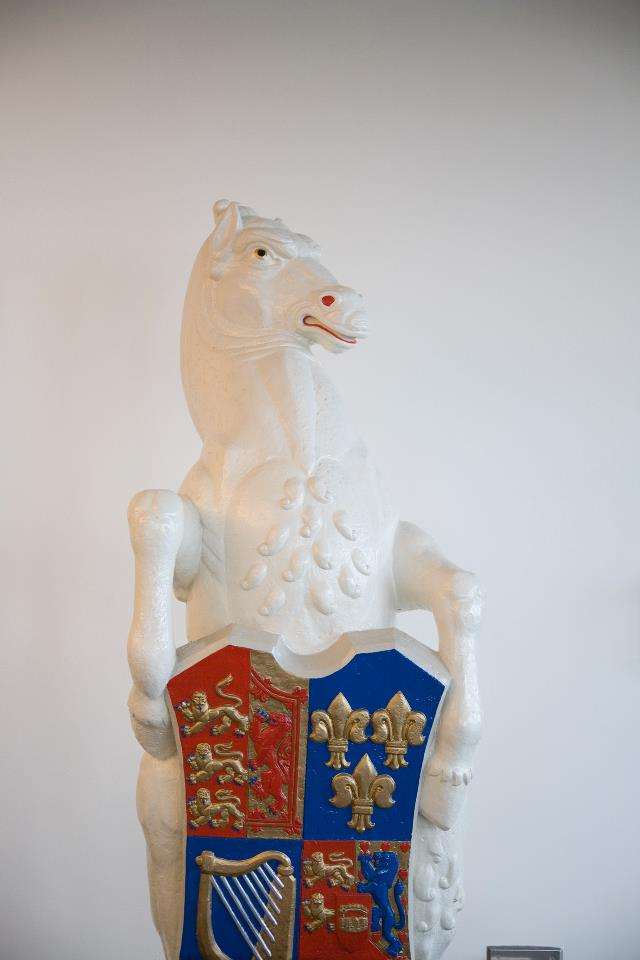
White Horse of Hanover

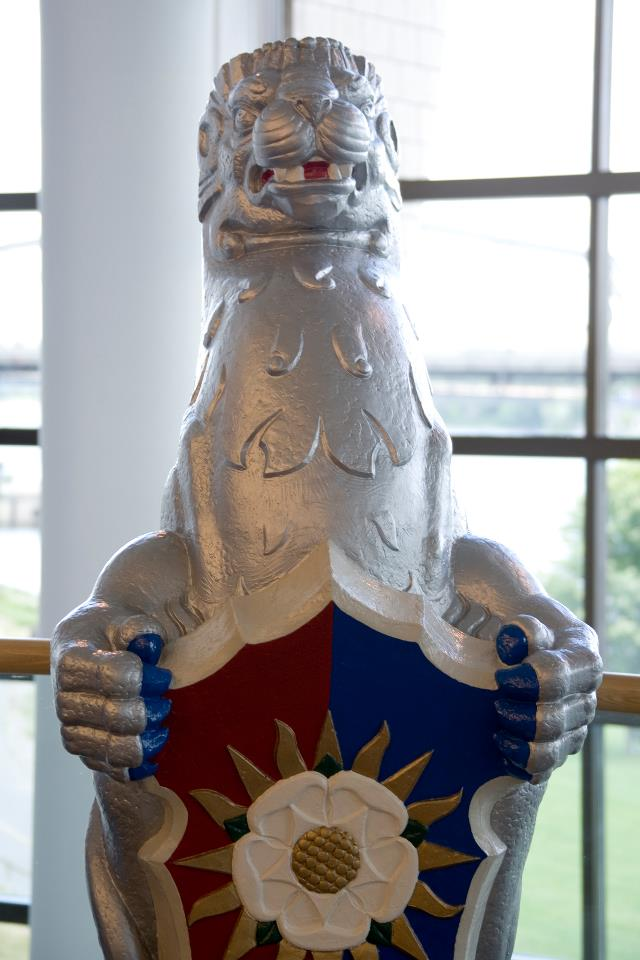
White Lion of Mortimer

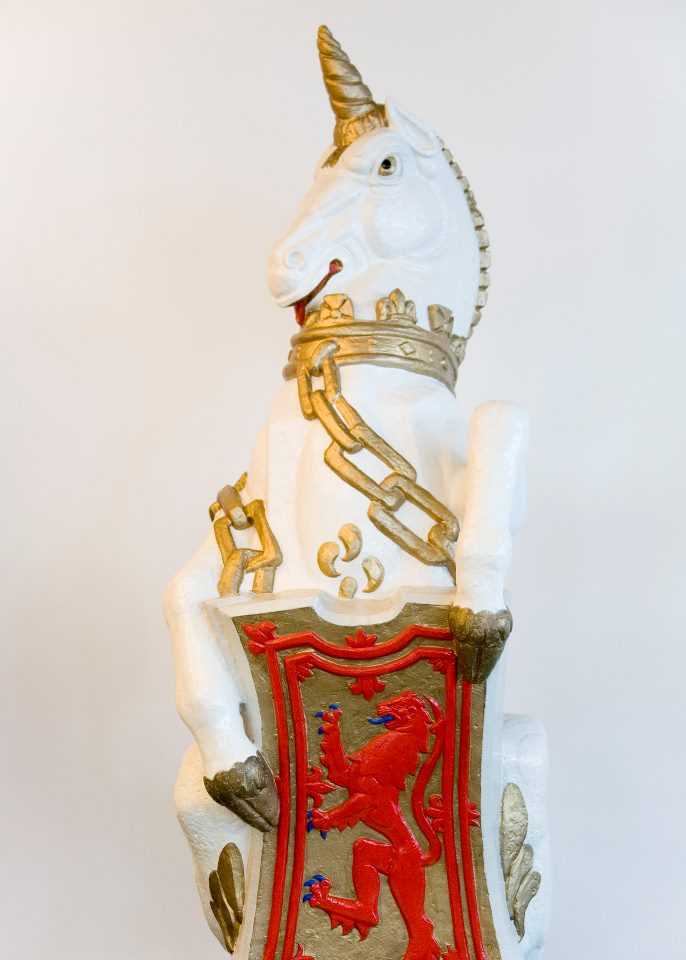
Unicorn of Scotland

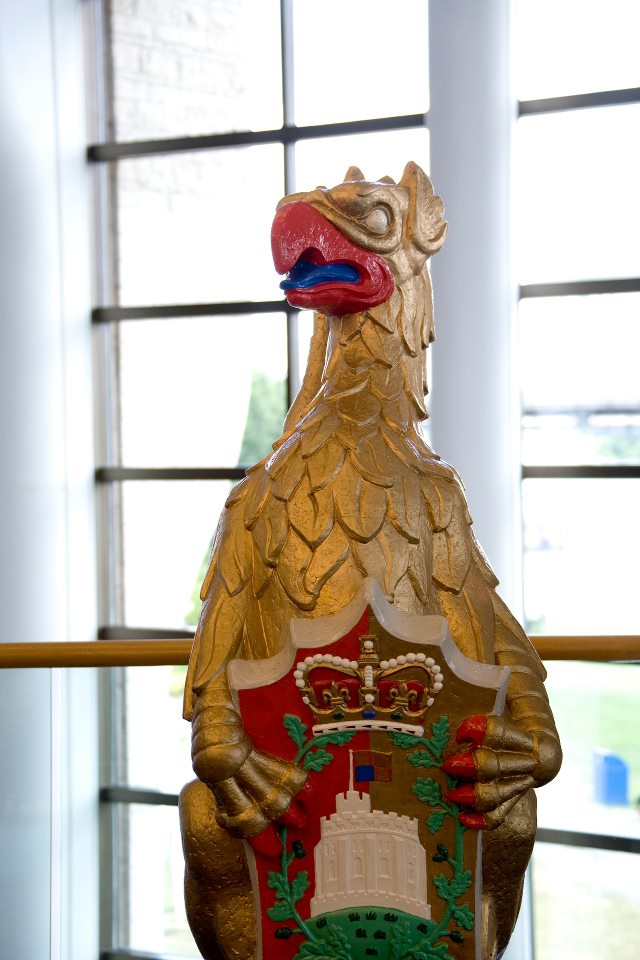
Griffin of Edward III

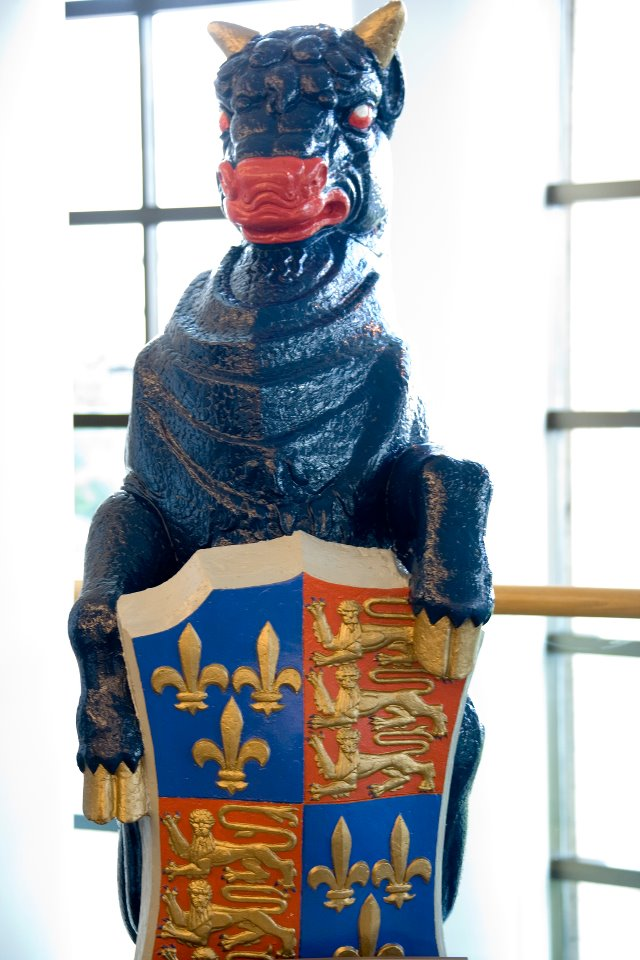
Black Bull of Clarence

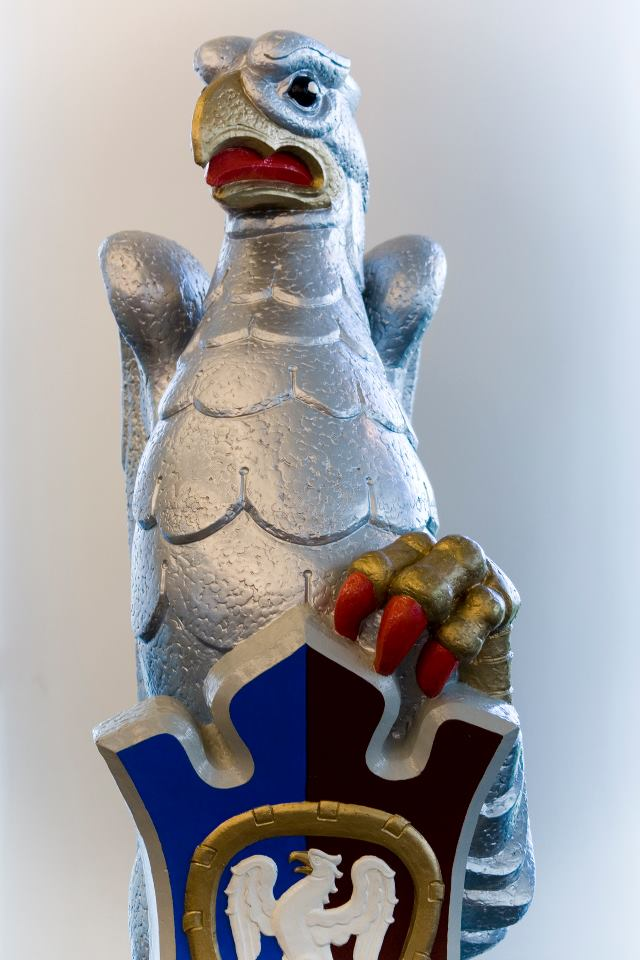
Falcon of the Plantagenets

== See also ==
- Canadian royal symbols
- Royal Mint
- List of public art in Richmond upon Thames
- Royal Badges of England
- The King's Beasts, Hampton Court
- The Queen's Beasts, St George's Chapel
- Royal supporters of England

== Bibliography ==
- London, H. Stanford; Bellew, Sir George (1953). The Queen's Beasts. Illustrated by Edward Bawden and Cecil Keeling. (1st ed.). London: Newman Neame. ASIN B00137BAOY.
