= Scottish lion =

Scottish lion may refer to

- the Royal Banner of Scotland
- the lion in the Royal coat of arms of Scotland
- British big cats, alleged big feline creatures living on the British Isles
