= England Lions =

England Lions may refer to:

- England national rugby league team
- England Lions (cricket team)

== See also ==
- English lion (disambiguation)
