= Roy Wolper =

American scholar and writer (born 1931-2020)

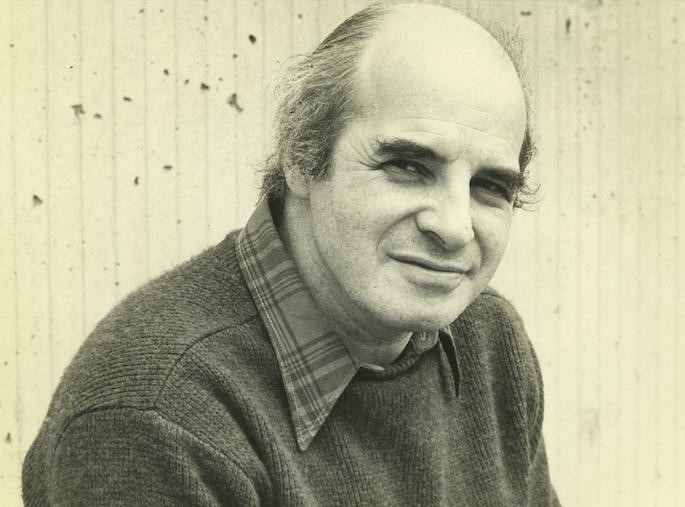
Roy Wolper (1975)

Roy Wolper (born 1931) is an American scholar and writer. A full-time professor at Temple University from 1967 to 1998, and a writer of fiction, he co-founded The Scriblerian and the Kit-Cats, a review journal for English literature, and served as its editor for nearly fifty years.

== Academic career ==
Wolper was born in Pittsburgh and attended the University of Pittsburgh, earning his Ph.D. in English in 1965, with a dissertation called Samuel Johnson and the Drama. He taught at Carnegie Mellon University and the University of Pittsburgh as an instructor. He became an assistant professor position at the University of Saskatchewan, and two years later, he took a position at Temple University in Philadelphia. He retired as a full professor in 1998 and was granted emeritus status from Temple in 2001.

His published scholarship focuses on English and French eighteenth-century literature, including work on Alexander Pope, Jewish studies and antisemitism, and Voltaire. His essay "Candide, Gull in the Garden?", in which he argued that one should not confuse the "limited vision" of Candide's main character with Voltaire's much broader one, is cited with approbation in Nicholas Cronk's edition of Candide. The article raised quite a stir, with one critic saying it contained some "provocative insights", and "challenged the generally positive interpretation" of the ending of Candide, even while not accepting the argument. His hermeneutical argument is analyzed in a journal article on how to teach Candide, and is surveyed in the MLA Approaches to Teaching Voltaire's Candide.

=== Fiction and personal essays ===
Wolper also wrote short stories published in University of Texas Quarterly, North Dakota Quarterly, The Available Press: Pen Short Story Collection, Short Story International, and elsewhere. His stories were also broadcast on the BBC (“The Death Man,” chosen as one of the best stories from 1985 and rebroadcast five times), CBC, NZBC, and SABC. He won the Doubleday Option prize and the National Endowment of the Arts Fellowship for Creative Writing. A personal essay of his was published in the New York Times.

=== The Scriblerian ===
Wolper is perhaps best known in the field of eighteenth-century literary scholarship as a founder and coeditor (along with Peter A. Tasch and Arthur J. Weitzman) of The Scriblerian and the Kit-Cats, an eighteenth-century review journal, from 1968 to 2017. During this time, the journal expanded beyond reviewing scholarship concerning the early eighteenth-century Scriblerians to include the Kit-Cat Club (a change reflected in the journal's title) in addition to the period’s major novelists (Daniel Defoe, Samuel Richardson, Henry Fielding, Tobias Smollett, and Laurence Sterne). An active critic on the journal, he had reviewed a over 1500 articles and books by 2017.

During his decades as coeditor of The Scriblerian, Wolper gained a reputation for hands-on copyediting, and a tribute in the journal notes "Roy could be merciless with copy"; he was praised for maintaining high academic standards for critical reviews, which the tribute noted is "so much more desirable and useful to our readers than the laudatory and obscurantist blurbs that book reviewing has too often become".
