= King's Beasts, Hampton Court Palace =

Heraldic sculptures

Coordinates: 51.40355°N 0.33909°W

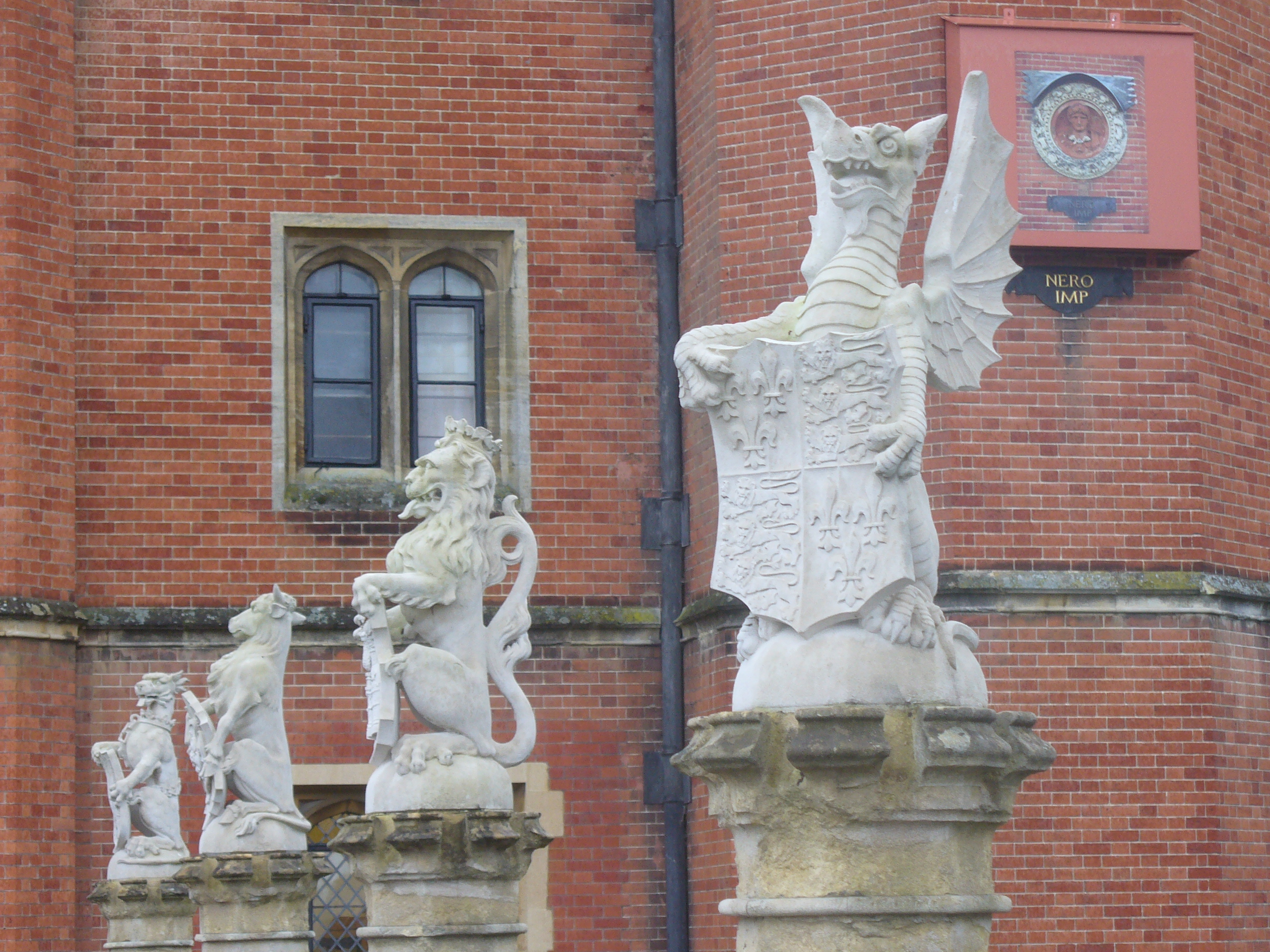
The King's Beasts, on the bridge before the Great Gatehouse

The King's Beasts are a series of 10 statues of heraldic animals that stand on the bridge over a moat leading to the great gatehouse of Hampton Court Palace. The original statues were commissioned by King Henry VIII to represent his ancestry and that of his third wife Jane Seymour. These were destroyed during renovations in the late 17th century, but new sculptures based on the original specifications were erected in the early 20th century.

The animals are: the lion of England, the Seymour lion, the royal dragon, the black bull of Clarence, the yale of Beaufort, the white lion of Mortimer, the White Greyhound of Richmond, the Tudor dragon, the Seymour panther, and the Seymour unicorn.

== History ==
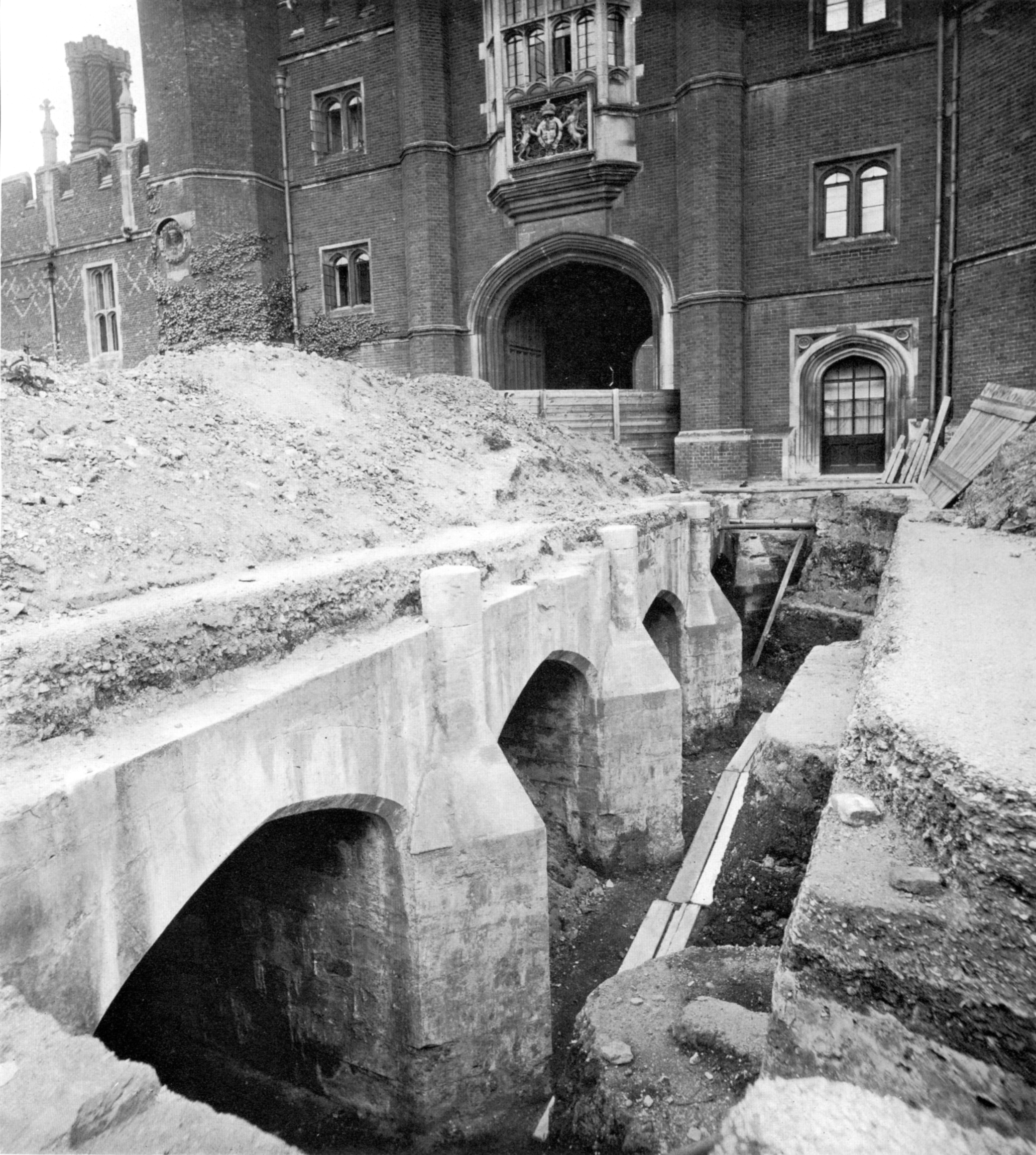
The bridge on which the King's Beasts had stood, as it looked at the time of its excavation in 1909. Only the lower potions of the bridge survived William III's late 17th century renovations, with none of the "Beasts" surviving intact.

The moat over which the bridge passes is likely of a design of the house's original owner Cardinal Wolsey, but in his time the bridge that spanned it would have been built of wood, but no archaeological evidence exists and no drawings of it are known. After the house came into the ownership of the King, Wolsey's bridge had been condemned and the building of a new stone structure had begun in 1535. In that year a payment was made to John Richmond and Richard Aman, quarrymen at Headington in Oxfordshire, for six hundred tons of stone for the facing of the bridge, its core being made of brick.

In October 1536 the main work was completed, by which time Henry had married a new queen, Jane Seymour. Whatever the original design for the bridge's decorations might have been, the King now decided that the bridge should become a commemoration of his marriage. Orders were given for the carving of the King's and Queen's beasts with shields to stand upon the bridge, with the carvers being Harry Corant and Richard Ridge from the neighbouring town of Kingston. Each statue cost 26 shillings apiece.

The bridge and its beasts stood until about the year 1691, when during alterations by William III, the upper part of the bridge and its ornamentation were town down and used to fill in the moat, with the lower part of the bridge covered up with soil. Despite being partially exposed in 1873, it wasn't until 1909 that Lewis Harcourt, the First Commissioner of Works, had the moat cleared. While the bridge was found to be in good condition, with one course of the original masonry left above the arches in some places, little of the pinnacles and the ornaments that topped it could be found. (Note: "no more was found than one embattled capital, a fragment of a dragon's wing, a good sized piece of a unicorn's head, and nearly the whole of one shield." (Dorling 1913, p. 43)) It was decided to reconstruct the beasts based on the original directions, with the size being determined by the fragments that had been found. Schomberg Kerr McDonnell, Secretary of the Office of Works, put the heraldic writer and archaeologist Edward Earle Dorling in charge of this reconstruction work.

== Beasts ==
=== King's crowned lion ===

A crowned lion of England was used by Henry as a dexter supporter. It holds a shield showing the Royal arms of England impaled with those of Jane Seymour.

=== Seymour panther ===

Jane's panther supports the Seymour family arms. As the heraldic panther closely resembles the heraldic Leopard, it was relatively simple to make the alteration from Anne Boleyn's beast.

=== Richmond greyhound ===

The greyhound had become one of the most popular beasts of the Tudors, with it being a supporter of Henry VII's and sometimes Henry VIII's arms. It had first been adopted as a symbol of Edward III and was used afterwards by many of his descendants, particularly those of the House of Lancaster. Its popular name The Greyhound of Richmond comes from its use by Henry VII's father Edmund Tudor, 1st Earl of Richmond.

The beast at Hampton Court has a leash attached to its collar, unlike most depictions of the royal beast. This appears to be the result of a misunderstanding about the beast's origin.

=== Beaufort yale ===

A yale holds the arms of Jane Seymour, granted to her by her husband. Henry IV's son John, Duke of Bedford was the first to use the yale, but it is not clear if there was any particular reason for this choice. Whatever the reason, after John's death it was picked up by his cousin John Beaufort, grandfather of Henry VII, and from that time the yale was regarded as a Beaufort beast.

=== Tudor dragon ===

The Tudor dragon was a favourite supporter of the Tudors, symbolising their Welsh ancestry. It holds a shield containing the Beaufort badge of an uncrowned portcullis. This symbol was extensively used by Henry VII, for instance forming the principal motif in the decoration of his chapel in Westminster Abbey, and from there becoming associated with the Palace of Westminster.

=== Mortimer panther ===

The queen's panther is duplicated, here holding the same conjoined arms carried by the king's lion.

=== Clarence black bull ===

The black bull of Clarence carries a shield with a Tudor rose on it. This badge is one of the most famous symbols of the Tudors, symbolising the union between the House of York (white rose) and the House of Lancaster (red rose), by the marriage between Elizabeth of York and Henry VII.

=== Mortimer lion ===

A Lion with a coronet (not the full royal crown) holds an escutcheon with Seymour's badge consisting of a phoenix and castle. It also includes a hawthorn bush, a reference to a Tudor badge, which in turn is an allusion to the legend of Richard III's circlet being found in a hawthorn bush and brought to Henry, after the Battle of Bosworth Field.

=== Royal dragon ===

A second royal dragon supports Henry's royal arms.

=== Seymour unicorn ===

A unicorn holds the full un-maritaled arms of the Queen. It is possible that the unicorn had been used as an English royal badge at some point, perhaps for Edward III. (Note: It is not the more familiar Scottish unicorn; it has a garland of flowers round its neck instead of a coronet.) It was a symbol of purity and fertility, and it has been suggested that the little-used symbol was chosen as a symbol of Henry's hope that the marriage would lead to the son he wanted so badly.

== Gallery ==
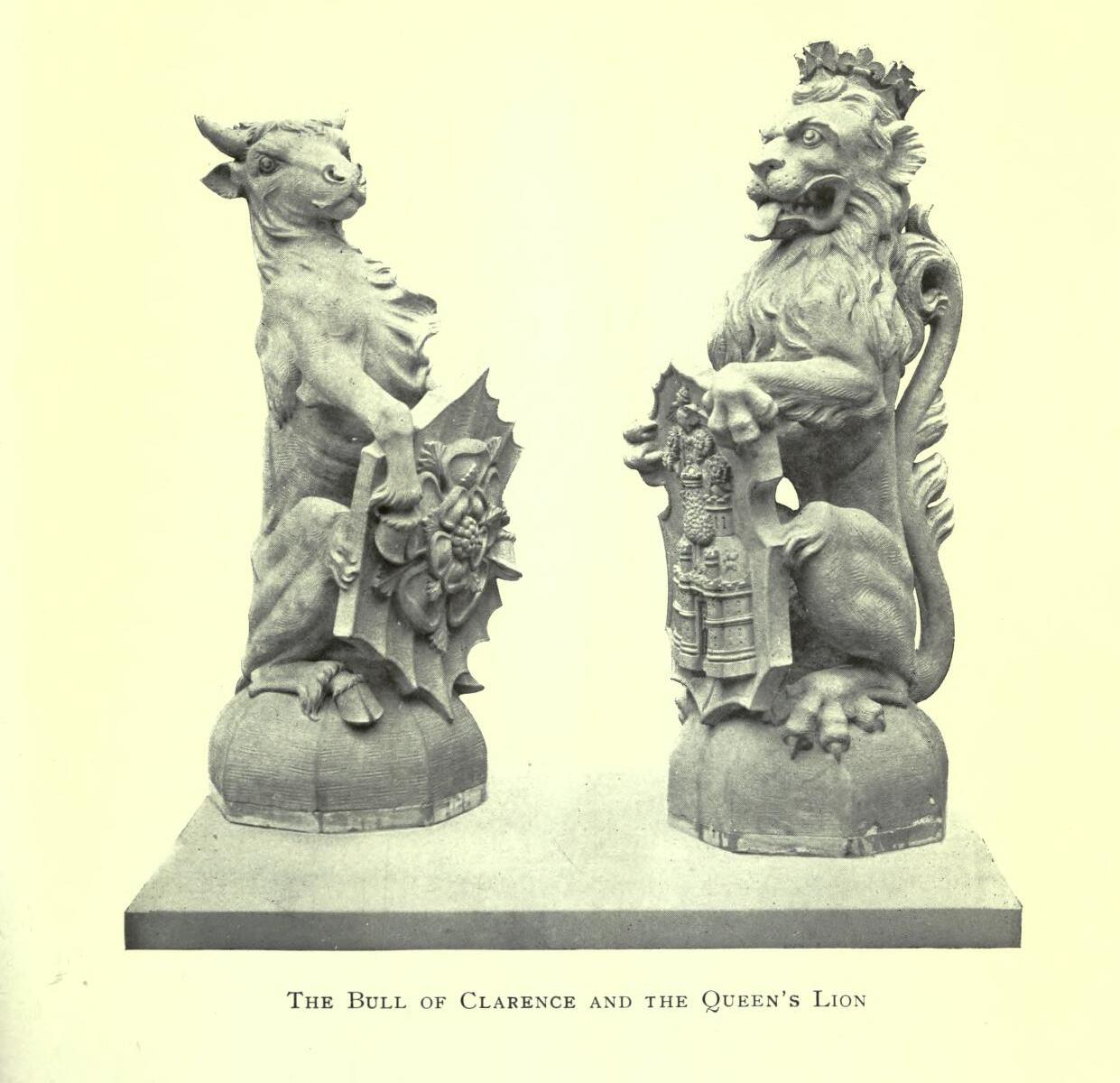
Clarence black bull and Mortimer lion

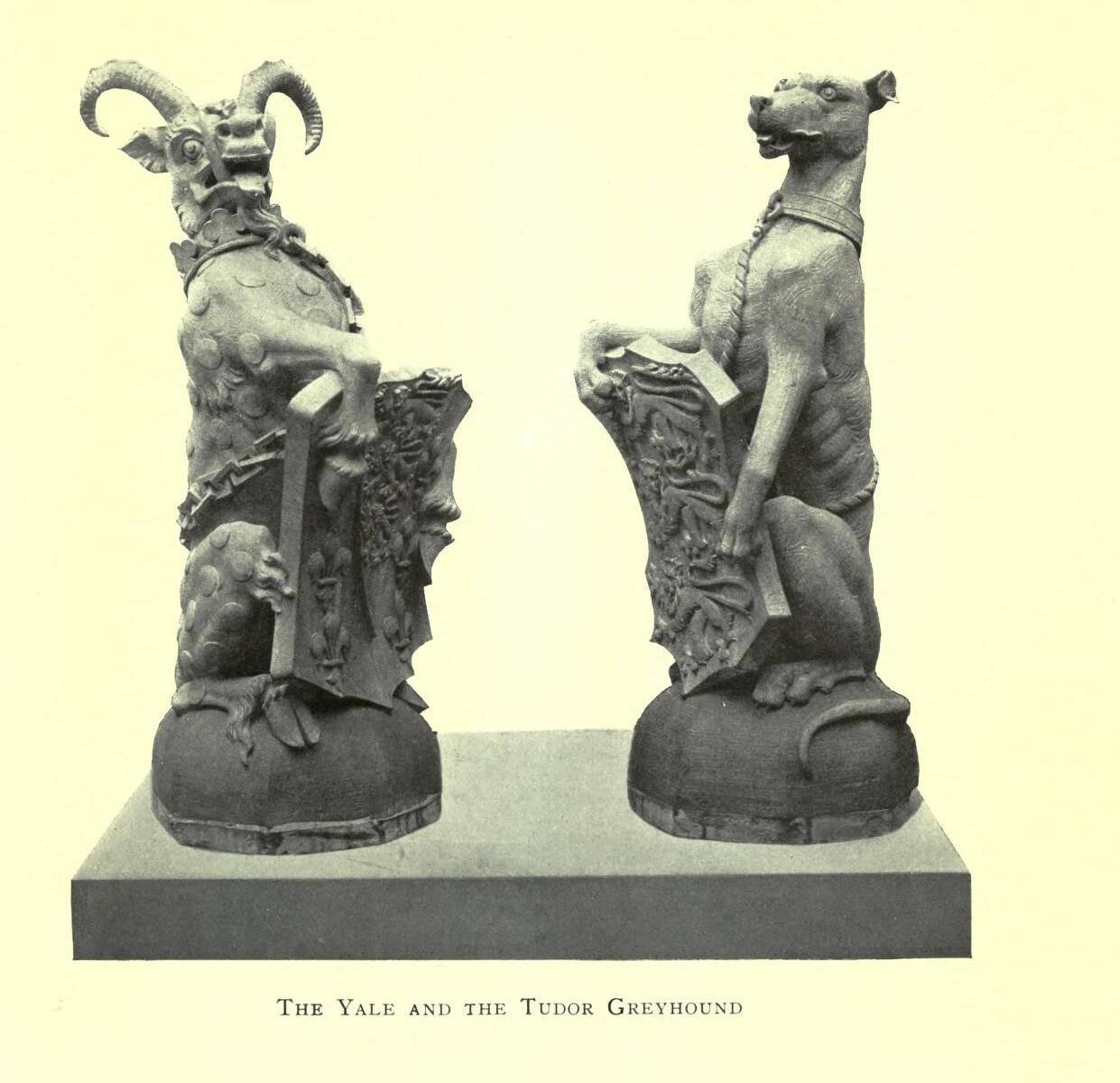
Beaufort yale and Richmond greyhound

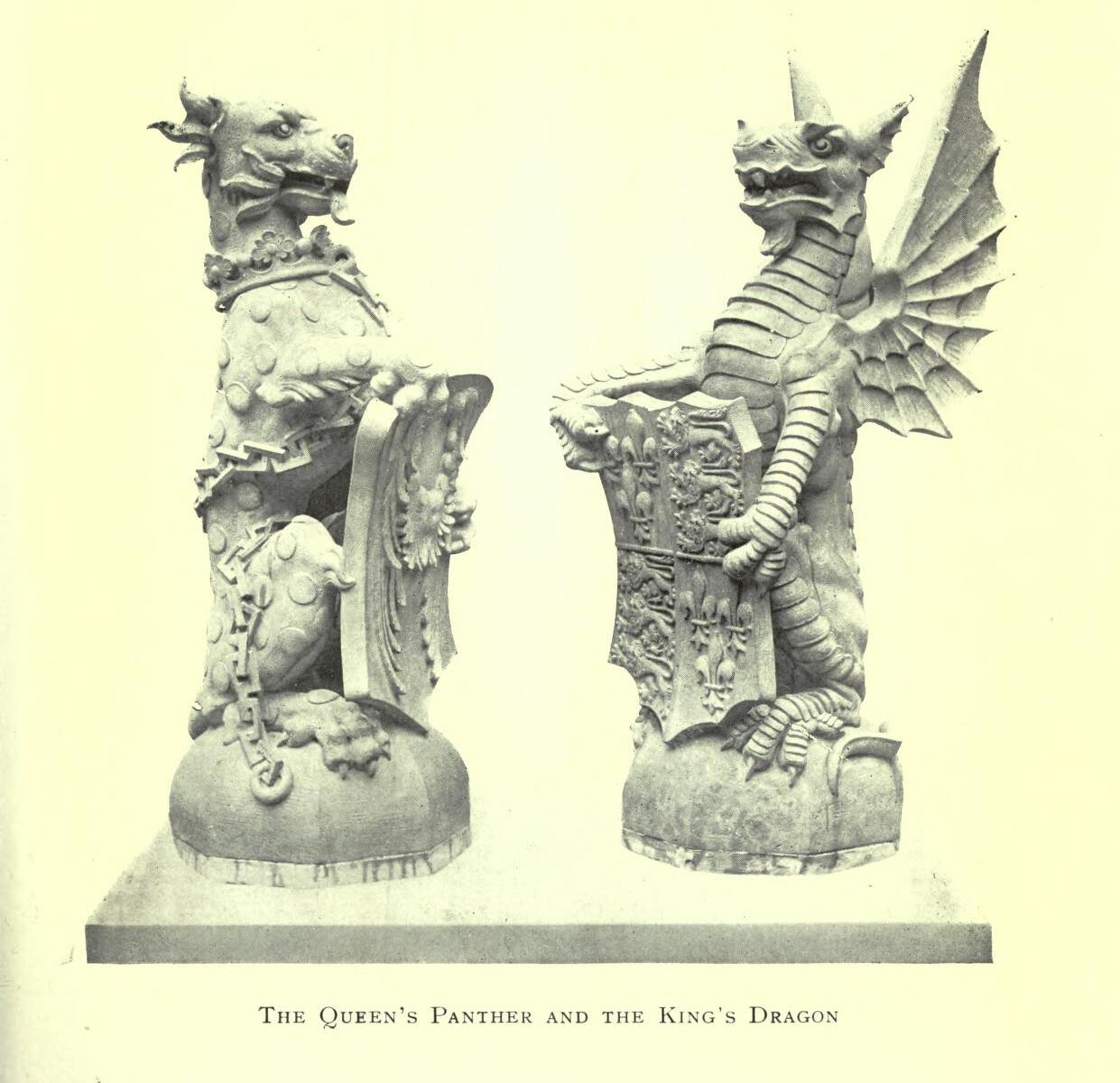
Seymour panther and Tudor dragon

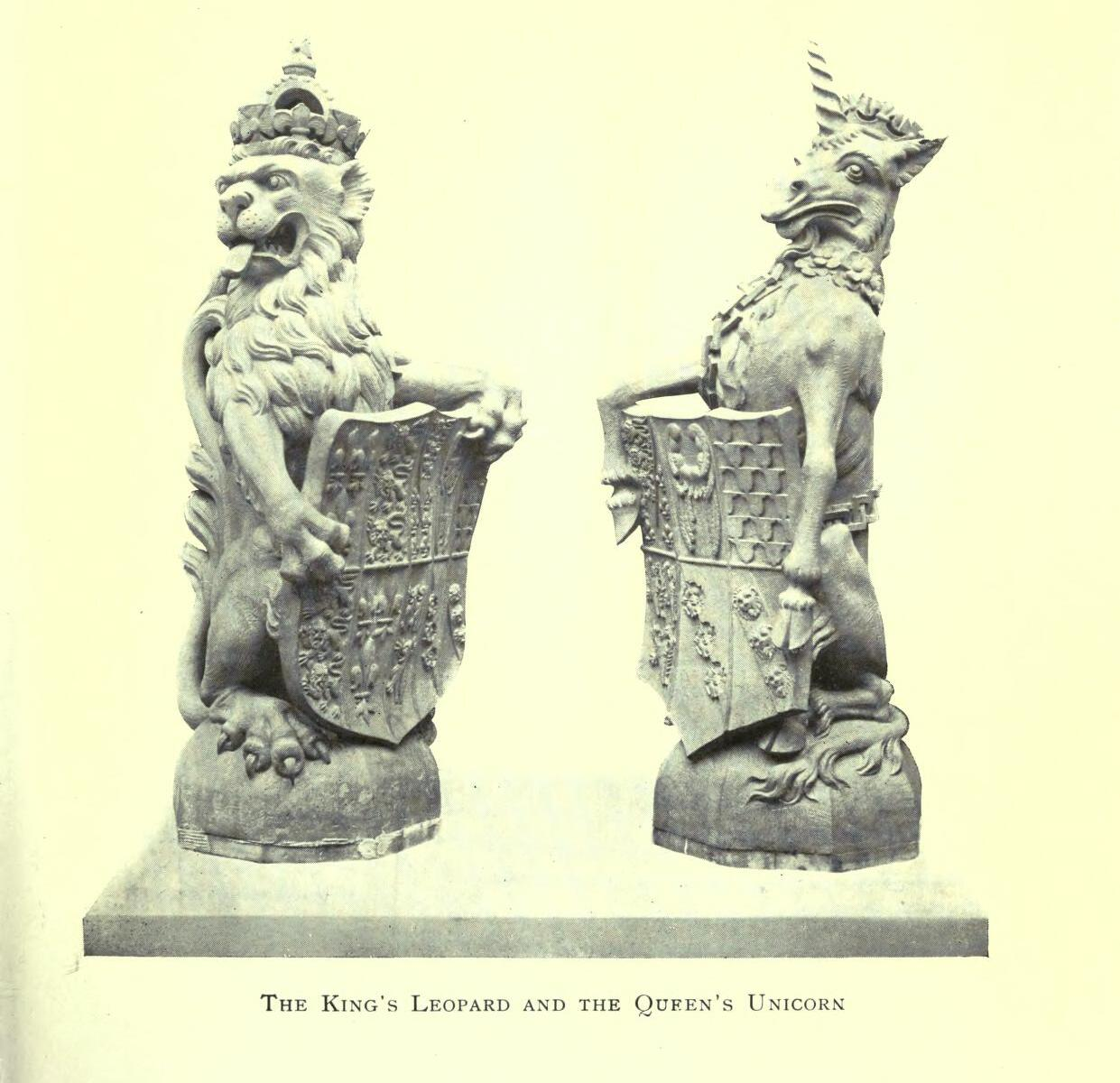
King's crowned lion and Seymour unicorn

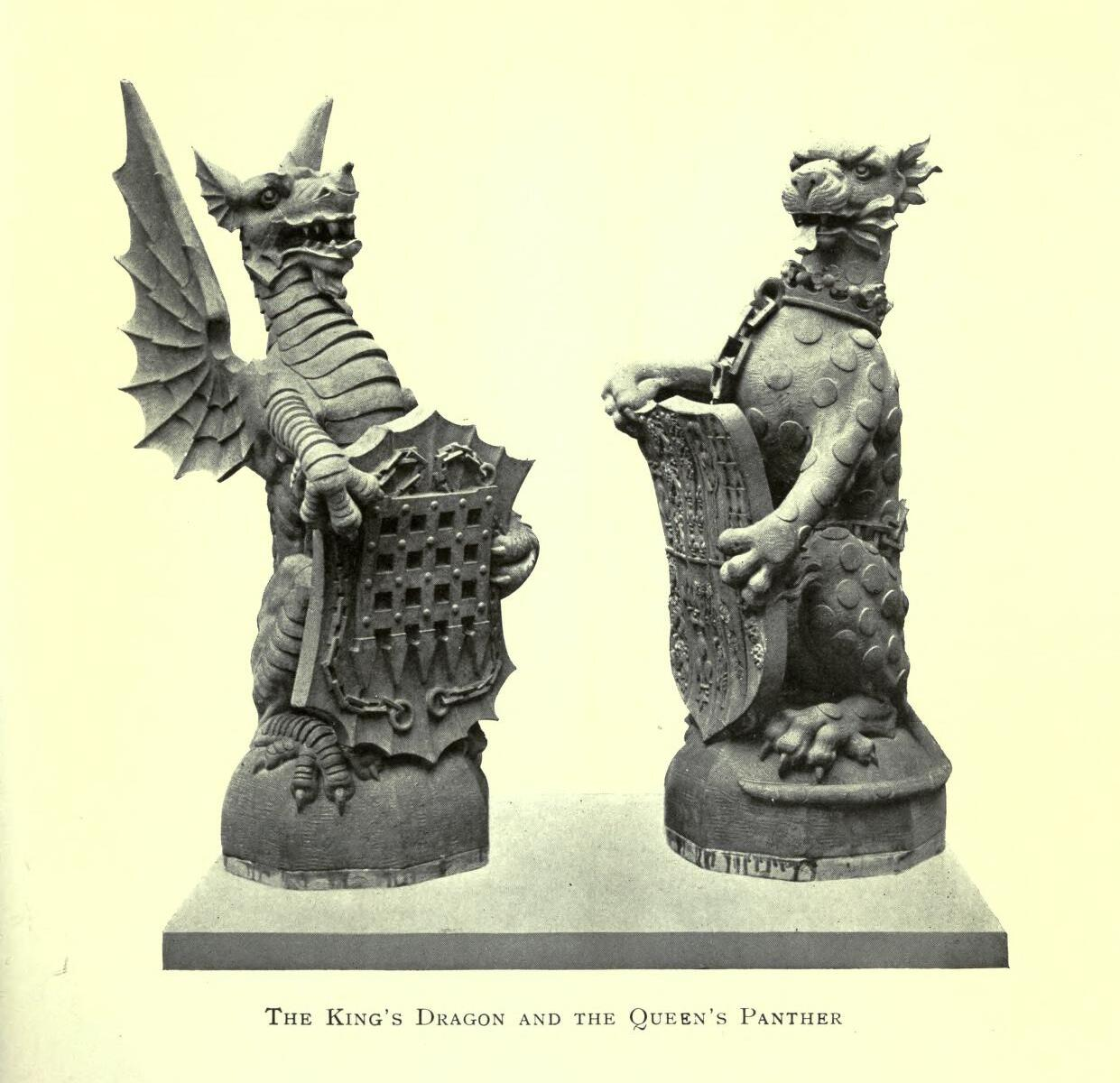
Royal dragon and Mortimer panther

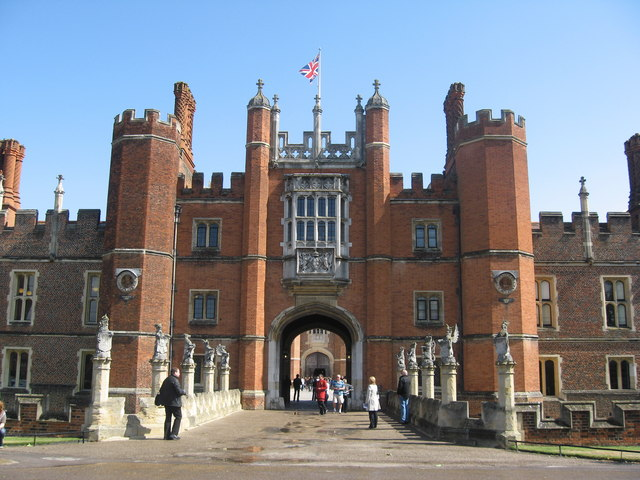
View of the West Entrance with the King's Beasts on either side of the bridge

== Other royal beast statuaries ==
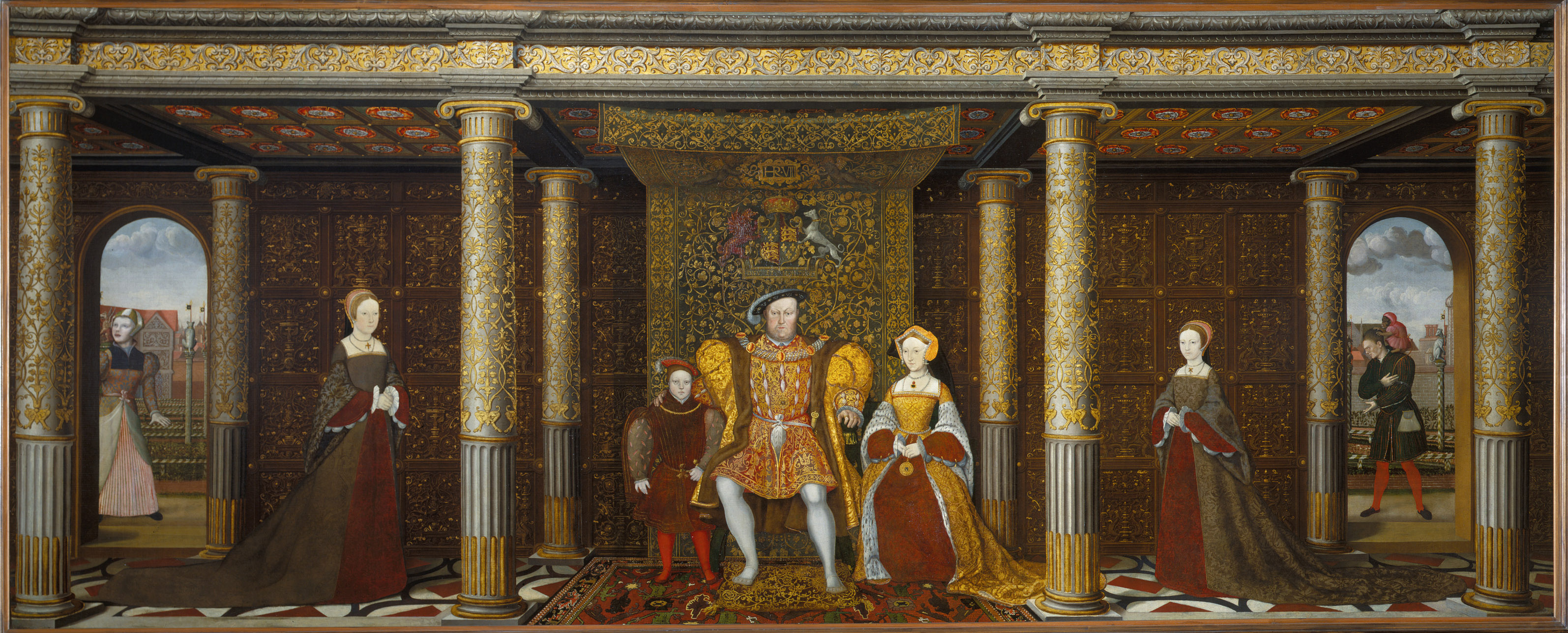
Henry VIII and his family, showing carved heraldic beasts in a garden, RCT

Beasts for the gardens of Henry VIII were made of timber and stone. George Cavendish, the biographer of Cardinal Wolsey, described carved and painted royal heraldic beasts in a garden at Richmond Palace. Wolsey said a dun cow (referring to the Earldom of Richmond) was also found in the heraldry of Thomas Boleyn and was a portent of the relationship of Anne Boleyn and Henry VIII.

The king's arms and beasts were cast in moulds by the painter Clement Urmeston as decorations for tents and temporary buildings at the Field of the Cloth of Gold in 1520.

Other series of King's or Queen's Beasts have been created, inspired by the Hampton Court beasts. Forty-two royal beasts sit atop St George's Chapel, Windsor Castle. The original beasts dated from the 16th century, but were removed in 1682, with new statues installed in 1925 when the chapel was restored. A set of Queen's Beasts, created for the coronation of Queen Elizabeth II, largely replicated the King's Beasts, but replaced the three Seymour items and one of the dragons with beasts representing aspects of Elizabeth's ancestry.

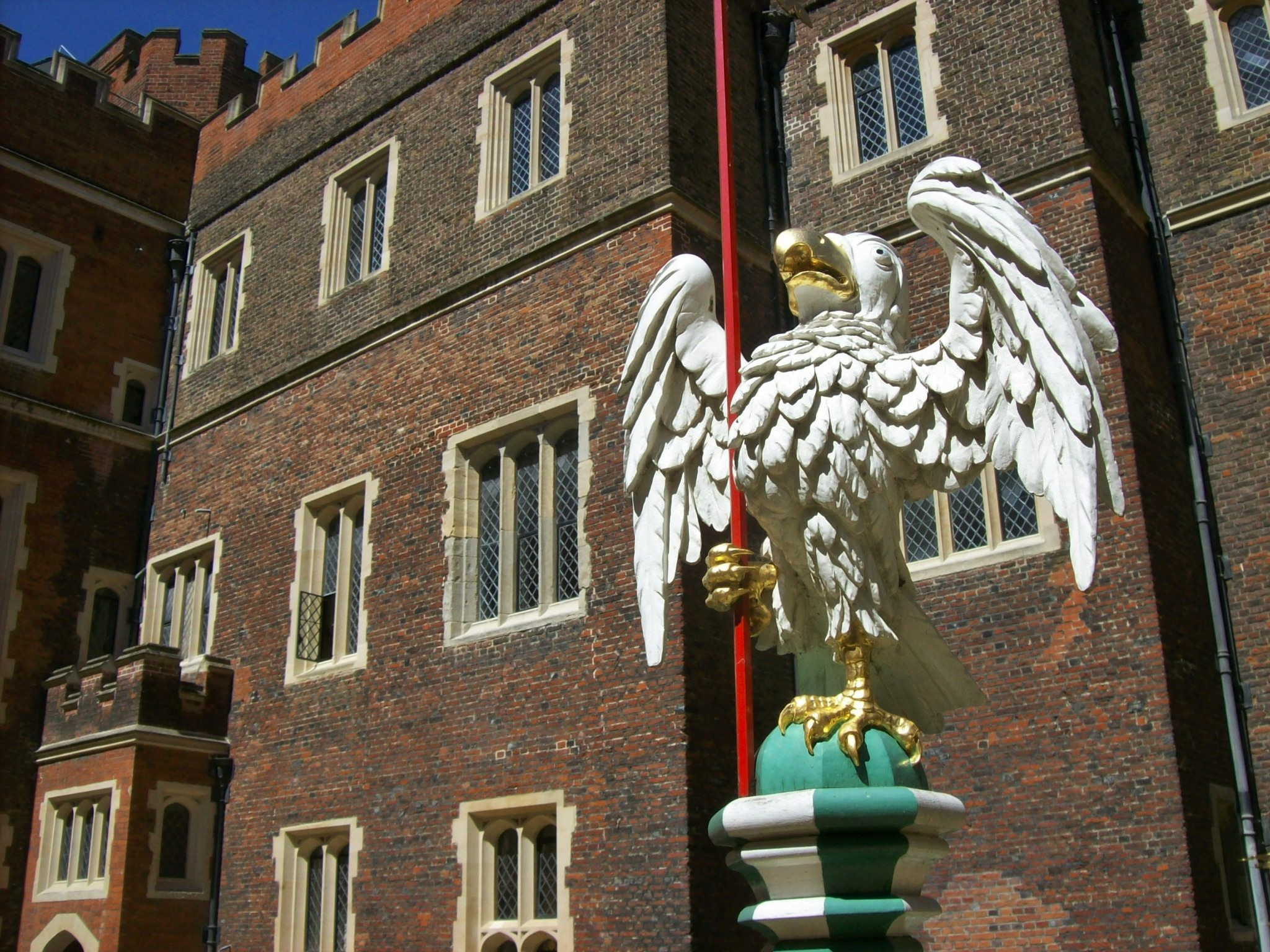
One of the wooden King's Beasts created in 2009 for the Chapel Court at Hampton Court Palace

In 2009, to celebrate the 500th anniversary of the accession to the throne of King Henry VIII, a new Tudor garden was created by Hampton Court in the form of the Chapel Court. To decorate the garden eight small wooden King's Beasts were carved in oak and painted in bright colours, each sitting atop a six-foot-high painted wooden column.
