= Thomas Baldwin =

Thomas Baldwin may refer to:

== Sports ==
- Tab Baldwin (born 1958), American-New Zealand basketball coach
- Tom Baldwin (racing driver) (1947–2004), NASCAR Modified driver
- Tom Baldwin (American football) (1961–2000), former American football defensive lineman
- Tommy Baldwin (1945–2024), British football player
- Tommy Baldwin Jr. (born 1966), NASCAR crew chief, son of NASCAR driver Tom Baldwin

== Characters ==
- Tom Baldwin (The 4400), the lead character of The 4400 television series
- Tom Baldwin (General Hospital), a character on soap opera General Hospital

== Others ==
- Thomas Baldwin (comptroller) (1568–1641), British architect and Comptroller of the King's Works
- Thomas Baldwin (architect) (c. 1750–1820), British architect, City Architect and Surveyor in Bath, Somerset
- Thomas Scott Baldwin (1854–1923), U.S. Army Major and pioneer balloonist
- Thomas Baldwin (philosopher) (born 1947), British philosopher
- Tom Baldwin (trader) (born 1956), bond trader investor and founder of the Baldwin Group of companies
- Tom Baldwin (journalist) (fl. 2010–2019), British journalist, Labour Party senior adviser and author
