= Edward Earle Dorling =

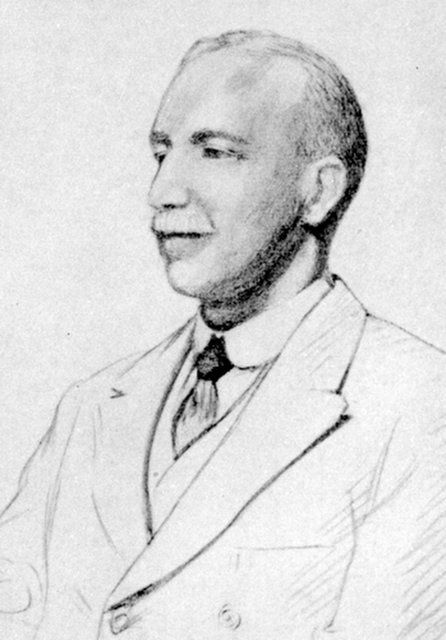
Edward Earle Dorling

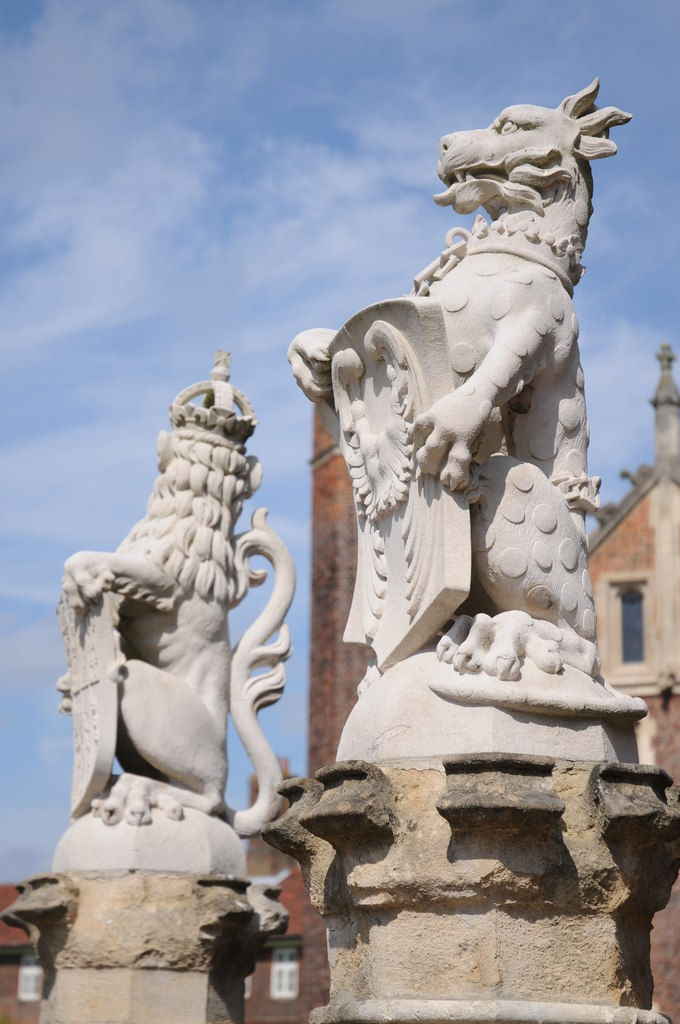
Two of the beasts designed by Dorling at Hampton Court

Edward Earle Dorling (5 May 1863 – 26 October 1943) was a priest of the Church of England, archaeologist, historian, and notable writer on heraldry.

Dorling was born in the parish of St Martin-in-the-Fields, London, the son of Edward Jonathan Dorling and Maria Earle. His grandfather Henry was a printer in Epsom, Surrey, and Edward inherited the business from his uncle in 1919. He was educated at Sherborne School in Dorset and at Clare College, Cambridge, and became a schoolteacher after leaving university. Four years later he took holy orders. He was a vicar choral at Salisbury Cathedral and a master at the Cathedral School until 1900, when he became a minor canon. He was vicar of Burcombe in Wiltshire from 1900 to 1905 and curate of Ham in Surrey thence until 1910, when he ceased to do regular parochial work. During the First World War he was a chaplain at the military port at Richborough.

Dorling provided the heraldic illustrations for the Victoria County History, as well as for Oswald Barron's celebrated article on heraldry in the 1911 edition of the Encyclopaedia Britannica. Despite his lack of formal training he had a gift for design, and his work had a bold medieval-inspired character, contrasting with the weak heraldic designs that had become common in the early modern period. He was a prolific designer of bookplates, designing over seventy in total, many of which are signed by the rebus of a little door (a "door-ling").

In 1909 the moat at Hampton Court was excavated after having been filled in during the 17th century. The bridge was found to be in perfect condition, but the twelve royal beasts that had adorned it had disappeared. Dorling was commissioned by the Office of Works to design replacements, at the time considered the most important piece of heraldic restoration attempted in England for many years.

Dorling was frequently consulted on matters of heraldry by the Royal Commission on the Historical Monuments of England, and his contributions were acknowledged in every publication from 1912 onwards. George V appointed him a commissioner in 1929. He died at Epsom in 1943, leaving a wife.

== Bibliography ==
- Register of Old Choristers of Salisbury Cathedral, 1810-1897 (1898)
- Heraldry of the Church: a Handbook for Decorators (1911)
- A History of Salisbury (1911)
- Leopards of England, and Other Papers on Heraldry (1913)
- Regiments at a Glance (1917)
- Heraldry as an Element in Church Decoration (1925)
- Epsom and the Dorlings (1939)
