= The Scriblerian and the Kit-Cats =

- Discipline: English literature
- Language: English
- Edited by: E. Derek Taylor

Publication details
- History: 1968–present
- Publisher: Auburn University at Montgomery, Longwood University, Auburn University (United States)
- Frequency: Biannual

Standard abbreviations
- ISO 4: Scriblerian Kit-Cats

Indexing
- ISSN: 0190-731X (print); 2165-0624 (web)
- LCCN: 2005216527
- OCLC no.: 505808793

Links
- Journal homepage

The Scriblerian and the Kit-Cats is a biannual review journal addressing English literature. It covers scholarly essays, book chapters, and books about English dramatists, poets, and novelists, as well as history and culture from the Restoration through the late eighteenth century. The journal also publishes literary and historical notes, including discussion of recent bibliographic transactions pertaining to the period.

It was established as The Scriblerian in 1968 at Temple University (by Roy Wolper, Peter A. Tasch, and Arthur J. Weitzman) and changed its name to include the Kit-Cats in 1971 to reflect initial coverage of scholarship about the Scriblerus Club and Kit-Cat Club respectively. By 1979 it expanded its coverage again, and published such texts as Alexander Pope's Pastorals.
