= Charles Dartiquenave =

English epicure and courtier

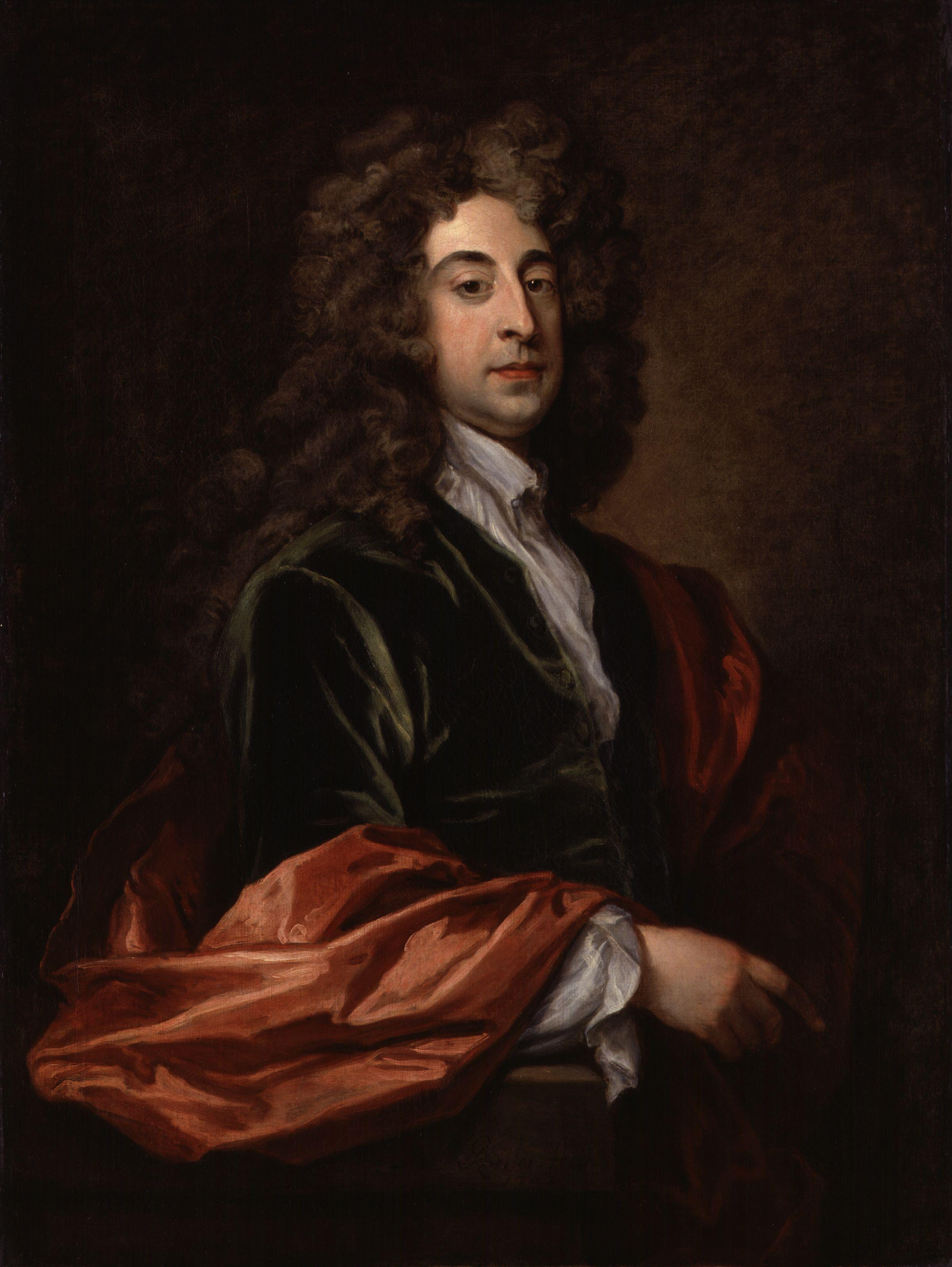
Charles Dartiquenave by Sir Godfrey Kneller, Bt.

Charles Dartiquenave, also known as Charles Darteneuf (baptised c.1664—19 October 1737) was an English epicure and courtier.

== Origins ==
Dartiquenave was rumoured to be the illegitimate child of Charles II. Biographers who have accepted the tradition of his royal paternity have suggested that his mother was a Frenchwoman. A more likely supposition is that he was the élève of a refugee French family, whose name he assumed, Another theory is that he was related to John James Dartiquenave, who was buried at Fulham 25 September 1709.

== Epicure ==
Dartiquenave was very fond of fine dining and convivial society, a bon vivant. Jonathan Swift and Dartiquenave were friends, and frequently dined and drank with Henry St. John and Thomas Parnell. ‘My friend Dartineuf,’ says Swift in his ‘Journal to Stella,’ ‘is the greatest punner of this town next myself,’ and in another passage of the same journal Swift dubs his friend ‘the man that knows everything and that everybody knows; that knows where a knot of rabble are going on a holiday and when they were there last.’

Alexander Pope in his imitations of Horace, ‘Satire I.,’ allows to each mortal his pleasure, and asserts that none deny Scarsdale his bottle and Darty his ham-pie. In ‘Satires’ (II. ii), Pope mentions ‘Darty’ as a culinary judge. Lord Lyttelton, in his ‘Dialogues of the Dead’ (dialogue xix.), made Apicius and Dartiquenave represent the epicures of ancient and modern history. Samuel Johnson recorded (in 1776) that when this book came out Dodsley the publisher remarked to him, ‘I knew Dartineuf well, for I was once his footman.’ Tradition has assigned to Dartiquenave some contributions to the ‘Tatler,’ e.g. a letter in No. 252, ‘On the Pleasure of Modern Drinking.’

== Politics and public offices ==
Dartiquenave was a strong supporter of the Whig Party who received employment through them. Among the treasury papers in the Record Office (vol. iii. No. 10) is a copy of an indenture in which Dartiquenave and another purchased ‘the office of keeper of Hampton Park, Bushey Park, and the Mansion House of Hampton Court during the lifetime of the Duchess of Cleveland’.

Political patronage gave Dartiquenave from 1706 to 1726 the post of paymaster of the Royal Works, and his salary in 1709 was at the rate of 6s. 6d. a day, but in 1717 he pleaded for an addition of 200l. per annum, and the Lords Commissioners of the Treasury sanctioned the increase from Michaelmas 1717 (Calendars of Treasury Papers, 1708–19). He was gazetted surveyor-general of the king's gardens in June 1726, and in March 1731 it was understood that he should be promoted to be surveyor of his majesty's private roads. However, that position went to someone else.

Dartiquenave lived in the outquarters of St. James's Palace. He died on 19 October 1737 and was buried on 26 October in the church of Albury, Hertfordshire, where a slab in the church was placed to his memory.

== Family ==
Dartiquenave was married to Mary Scroggs, daughter of John Scroggs of Albury parish. She was born in 1684 and became coheiress to the manor of Patmere in Albury. Scroggs died at Albury and was buried there on 31 August 1756.

Dartiquenave's son was a captain in the guards, and his grandson sold the property in 1775.

== Publications ==
A thin folio volume of twenty-three pages, containing his school exercises in Latin and Greek verse, was printed in 1681, with an address to Charles II and a dedication to Lord Halifax. Dartiquenave was at that time at school in Oxenden Street, Haymarket.

== Kit-Cat Club ==
As an authority in social life and a friend to the Whig Party, Dartiquenave was a member of the Kit-Cat Club.

His club portrait was painted by Godfrey Kneller, and engraved between Nos. 40 and 41, by John Faber the Younger, in the collections of the Kit-Cat portraits published in 1735. The engraving was reproduced in the volume of ‘Kit-Cat Club Portraits,’ 1821, and a medallion print from it was prefixed to Nichols's edition of the ‘Tatler,’ vol. vi. Kneller's portrait of Dartiquenave is usually considered one of the best in the set, as showing strong individuality of character.

== References and sources ==
Sources

- Dictionary of National Biography, 1885–1900, Volume 14, at Wikisource.
- Gent. Mag. i. 127, 175, vii. 638.
- Tatler, Nichols's ed. vi. 291–4 (1786).
- Kit-Cat Club (1821), pp. 223–4.
- Noble's Granger, iii. 185–7.
- Boswell's Johnson (ed. 1835), vi. 77.
- Swift's Works (ed. 1883), ii. 29, 112, 133, 184–5, 204, iii. 16, 87, 138.
- Quarterly Rev. xxvi. 437 (1822).
- J.C. Smith's Mezzotint Portraits (1878), i. 383.
- Cussans's Hertfordshire, sub. ‘Albury,’ pp. 162–8.
- Clutterbuck's Hertfordshire, iii. 336.

Attribution

This article incorporates text from a publication now in the public domain: Stephen, Leslie, ed. (1888). "Dartiquenave, Charles". Dictionary of National Biography. Vol. 14. London: Smith, Elder & Co.
