= Thomas Baldwin (comptroller) =

English comptroller (1568–1641)

Thomas Baldwin (1568, Watford – 1641, Berkhamsted) was Comptroller of the King's Works from 1606 to 1641.

Baldwin came from a family of Hertfordshire gentry. As Comptroller he seems to have been an administrator rather than an architect but did carry out a number of designs. He designed the Jesus Hospital at Bray, Berkshire for the Worshipful Company of Fishmongers in 1623. He is known to have been consulted by the University of Oxford in 1632 about the Selden End of the Bodleian Library and he was involved in the extension of Holland House in 1638–1640 by Henry Rich, Earl of Holland.

There is a wall monument to him in the south aisle of St Peter's Church, Berkhamsted by Nicholas Stone (1642).
