= Kit-Cat Club =

London gentleman's club

The Kit-Cat Club (sometimes Kit Kat Club) was an early 18th-century English club in London with strong political and literary associations. Members of the club were committed Whigs. They met at the Trumpet Tavern in London and at Water Oakley in the Berkshire countryside.

The first meetings were held at a tavern in Shire Lane (parallel with Bell Yard and now covered by the Royal Courts of Justice) run by an innkeeper called Christopher Catt. He gave his name to the mutton pies known as "Kit Cats" from which the name of the club is derived.

The club later moved to the Fountain Tavern on The Strand (now the site of Simpson's-in-the-Strand), and latterly into a room specially built for the purpose at Barn Elms, the home of the secretary Jacob Tonson. In summer, the club met at the Upper Flask, Hampstead Heath.

== Origins ==
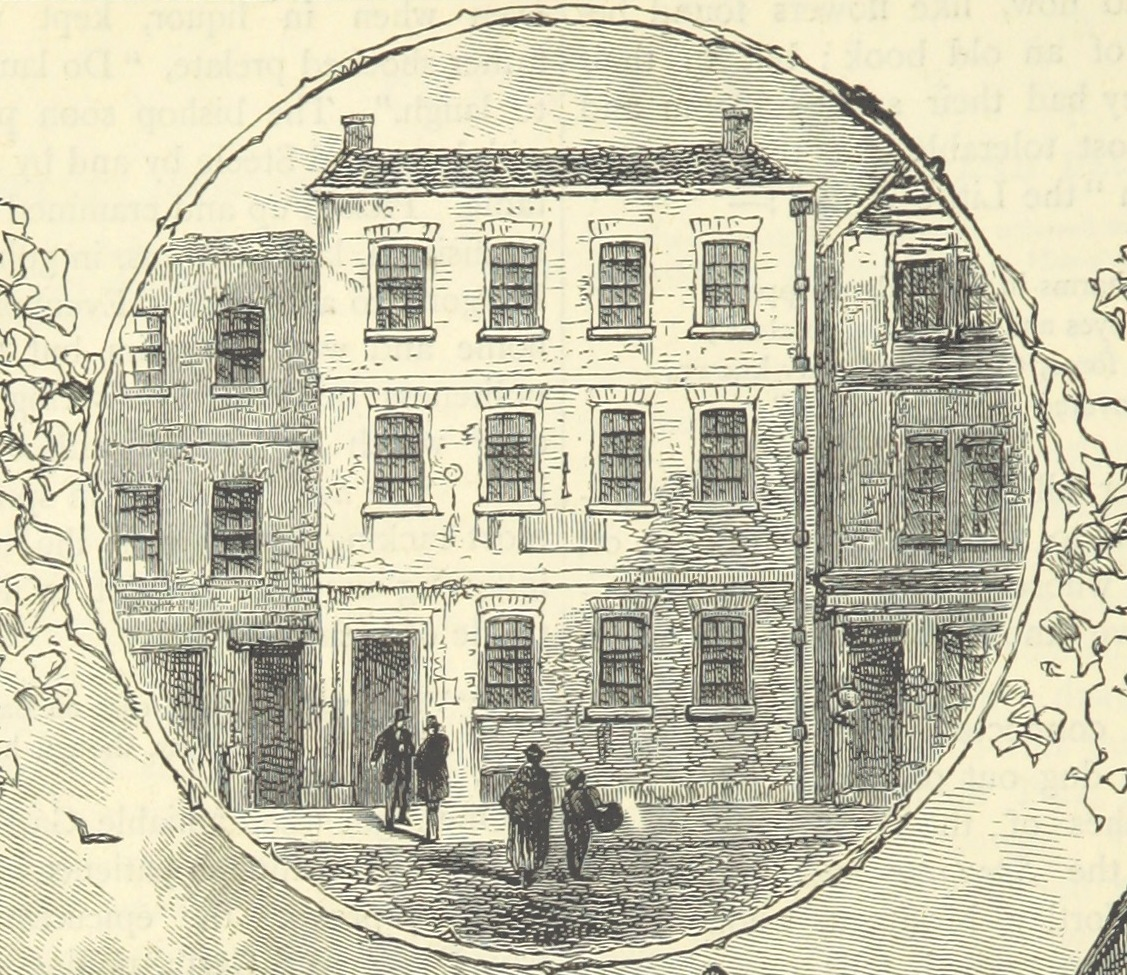
The Trumpet, Shire Lane, Temple Bar, in 1778

The origin of the name "Kit-Cat Club" is unclear. In 1705 Thomas Hearne wrote: "The Kit Cat Club got its name from Christopher Catling. [Note, a Pudding Pye man.]" Other sources give his surname as Catt (or some variant such as Cat or Katt): John Timbs (Club Life of London), Ophelia Field (The Kit-Kat Club), John Macky (A Journey Through England).

A nickname for Christopher is "Kit". Christopher Catt was the keeper of a pie-house in Shire Lane, by Temple Bar (then located in Fleet Street), where the club originally met. His famous mutton pies ("Kit-Kats") were named after him, and formed a standing dish at meetings of the club; the pie is thus itself sometimes regarded (e.g., by Joseph Addison in The Spectator) as the origin of the club's name.

It is possible that the club began at the end of the 17th century as the so-called "Order of the Toast". Indeed, a famous characteristic of the Kit-Kat was its toasting glasses, used for drinking the health of the reigning beauties of the day; verses in their praise were engraved on the glasses. If so, one can place the date before 1699, when Elkanah Settle wrote a poem "To the most renowned the President and the rest of the Knights of the most Noble Order of the Toast." It was this very habit of "toasting" that led Dr. Arbuthnot to produce the following epigram, which hints at yet another possible origin of the club's name:

Whence deathless Kit-Kat took his name
Few critics can unriddle
Some say from pastrycook it came
And some from Cat and Fiddle.
From no trim beaus its name it boasts
Grey statesmen or green wits
But from the pell-mell pack of toasts
Of old Cats and young Kits.

== Possible earlier objectives ==
John Vanbrugh's modern biographer Kerry Downes suggests that the club's origins go back to before the Glorious Revolution of 1688; and that its political importance for the promotion of Whig objectives was greater before it became known. Those objectives were a strong Parliament, a limited monarchy, resistance to France, and the Protestant succession to the throne. Downes cites John Oldmixon, who knew many of those involved, and who wrote in 1735 of how some club members "before the Revolution [of 1688] met frequently in the Evening at a Tavern, near Temple Bar, to unbend themselves after Business, and have a little free and cheerful Conversation in those dangerous Times". Horace Walpole, son of Kit-Cat Robert Walpole, refers to the respectable middle-aged 18th-century Kit-Cat club as "generally mentioned as a set of wits, in reality the patriots that saved Britain".

== Prominent members ==
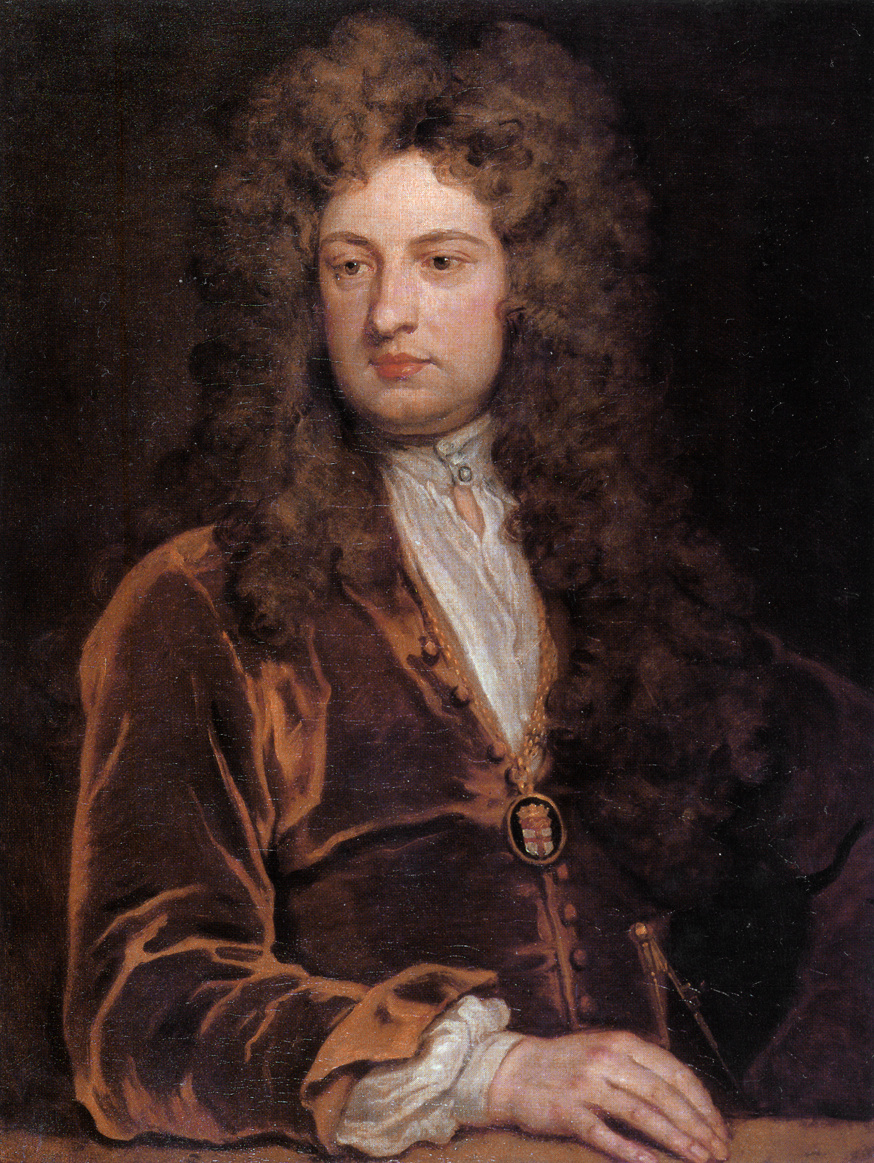
Sir John Vanbrugh in Godfrey Kneller's kit-cat portrait

Amongst the club's membership were writers such as William Congreve, John Locke, Sir John Vanbrugh, and Joseph Addison, and politicians including Duke of Somerset, the Earl of Burlington, Duke of Newcastle-upon-Tyne, The Earl of Stanhope, Viscount Cobham, Abraham Stanyan and Sir Robert Walpole.

Other notables included Samuel Garth, Charles Dartiquenave, Richard Steele, and the Dukes of Grafton, Devonshire, Kingston, Richmond, Manchester, Dorset, and Lords Sunderland and Wharton. Of some notoriety were Lord Mohun and the Earl of Berkeley. The artist Sir Godfrey Kneller was also a member; his 48 portraits in a standard "kit-cat" format of 36 by 28 inches, painted over more than twenty years, form the most complete known members list of the club. Many of these portraits currently hang in galleries created in a partnership between the National Portrait Gallery and the National Trust at Beningbrough Hall in North Yorkshire.

== Toasts ==
The toasts of the Kit-Kat Club were famous at the time, and were drunk to the honour of a reigning beauty, or lady to whom the Club wished to do particular honour. We know by name some of those who were toasted: Lady Mary Wortley Montagu; Lady Godolphin, Lady Sunderland, Lady Bridgewater, and Lady Monthermer, all daughters of John Churchill, 1st Duke of Marlborough, except Lady Mary Wortley Montagu who was the daughter of Evelyn Pierrepont, 5th Earl of Kingston-upon-Hull, and only seven years old when toasted; the Duchess of Bolton, the Duchess of Beaufort, the Duchess of St Albans; Anne Long, a daughter of Sir James Long, 2nd Baronet, and friend of Jonathan Swift; Catherine Barton, Newton's niece and Charles Montagu's mistress; Mrs. Brudenell and Lady Wharton, Lady Carlisle and Mrs. Kirk and Mademoiselle Spanheim, among them. Those toasted had their names engraved on a glass goblet.

== Notable members ==
- Joseph Addison
- William Pulteney, 1st Earl of Bath
- James Berkeley, 3rd Earl of Berkeley
- John Vaughan, 3rd Earl of Carbery
- Charles Howard, 3rd Earl of Carlisle
- Charles Lennox, 1st Duke of Richmond
- Richard Boyle, 3rd Earl of Burlington
- Richard Temple, 1st Viscount Cobham
- William Congreve
- William Cowper, 1st Earl Cowper
- Charles Dartiquenave
- William Cavendish, 2nd Duke of Devonshire
- John Dormer
- Lionel Sackville, 1st Duke of Dorset
- Charles Sackville, 6th Earl of Dorset
- Edmund Dunch (Whig)
- Samuel Garth
- Francis Godolphin, 2nd Earl of Godolphin
- Charles FitzRoy, 2nd Duke of Grafton
- Charles Montagu, 1st Earl of Halifax
- Evelyn Pierrepont, 1st Duke of Kingston-upon-Hull
- Henry Clinton, 7th Earl of Lincoln
- Charles Montagu, 1st Duke of Manchester
- John Churchill, 1st Duke of Marlborough
- Arthur Maynwaring
- Charles Mohun, 4th Baron Mohun of Okehampton
- John Montagu, 2nd Duke of Montagu
- Thomas Pelham-Holles, 1st Duke of Newcastle
- Robert Walpole
- Richard Boyle, 2nd Viscount Shannon
- Godfrey Kneller
- John Somers, 1st Baron Somers
- Charles Seymour, 6th Duke of Somerset
- James Stanhope, 1st Earl Stanhope
- Abraham Stanyan
- Richard Steele
- George Stepney
- Charles Spencer, 3rd Earl of Sunderland
- Jacob Tonson
- John Vanbrugh
- William Walsh (poet)
- Thomas Wharton, 1st Marquess of Wharton
- Spencer Compton, 1st Earl of Wilmington
- John Locke

== Kit Cat Club Portraits ==
The artist, Godfrey Kneller was commissioned to paint portraits of the club's members. He adopted a standard 'kit-cat' format of 36 x 28 inches instead of the standard 30 x 25 inches for the portraits. In the 1730s they hung in a special room which Jacob Tonson junior had built at his house at Barn Elms.

Mezzotint portraits of the members of the Kit Cat Club by John Faber the Younger after Sir Godfrey Kneller (selection from the total of 47)
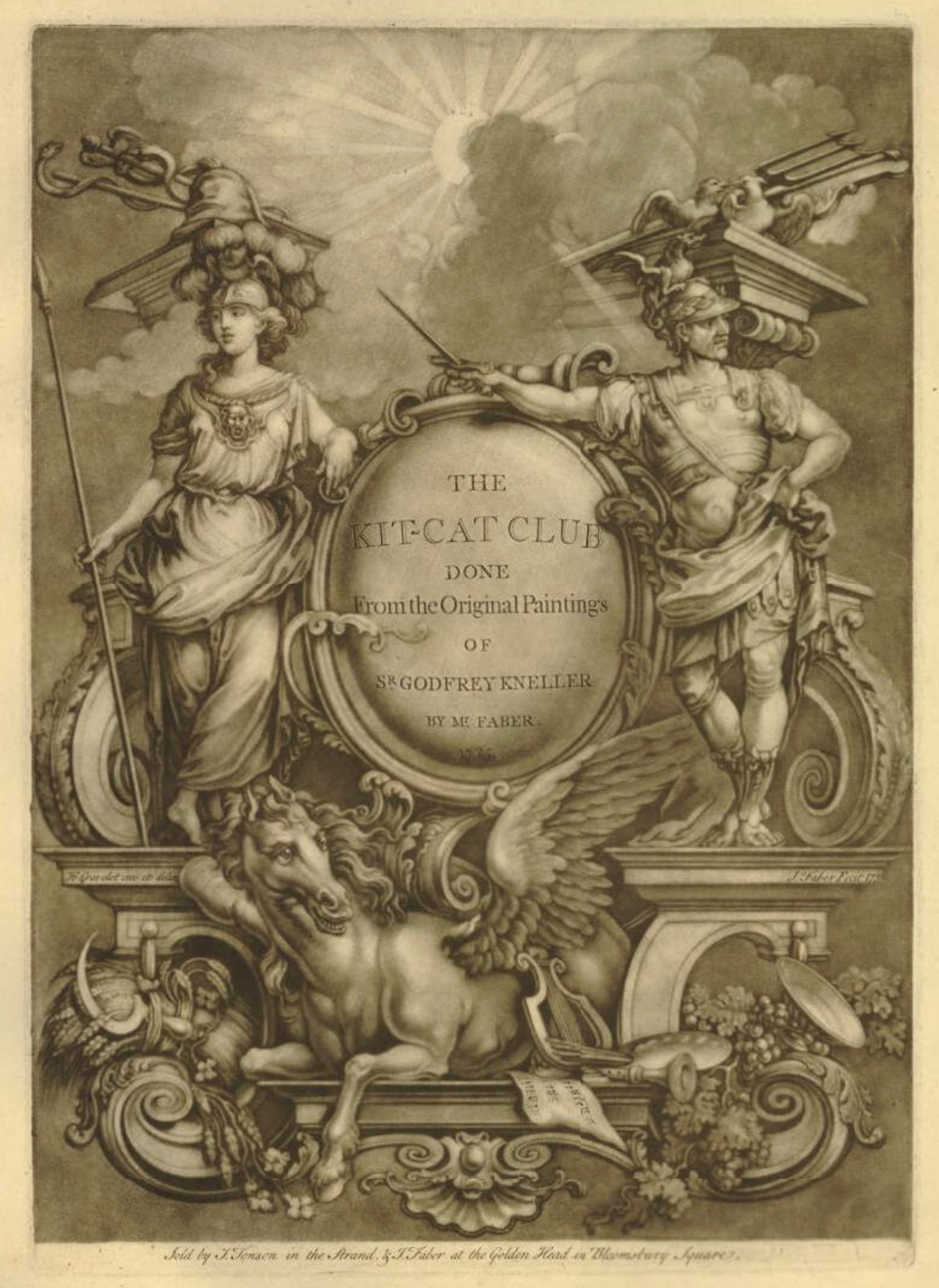
Mezzotint title page from the Kit Cat Club portraits by John Faber the Younger, 1735. Chaloner Smith 1883; British Mezzotinto portraits from the introduction of the art to the early part of the present century # 208. British Museum

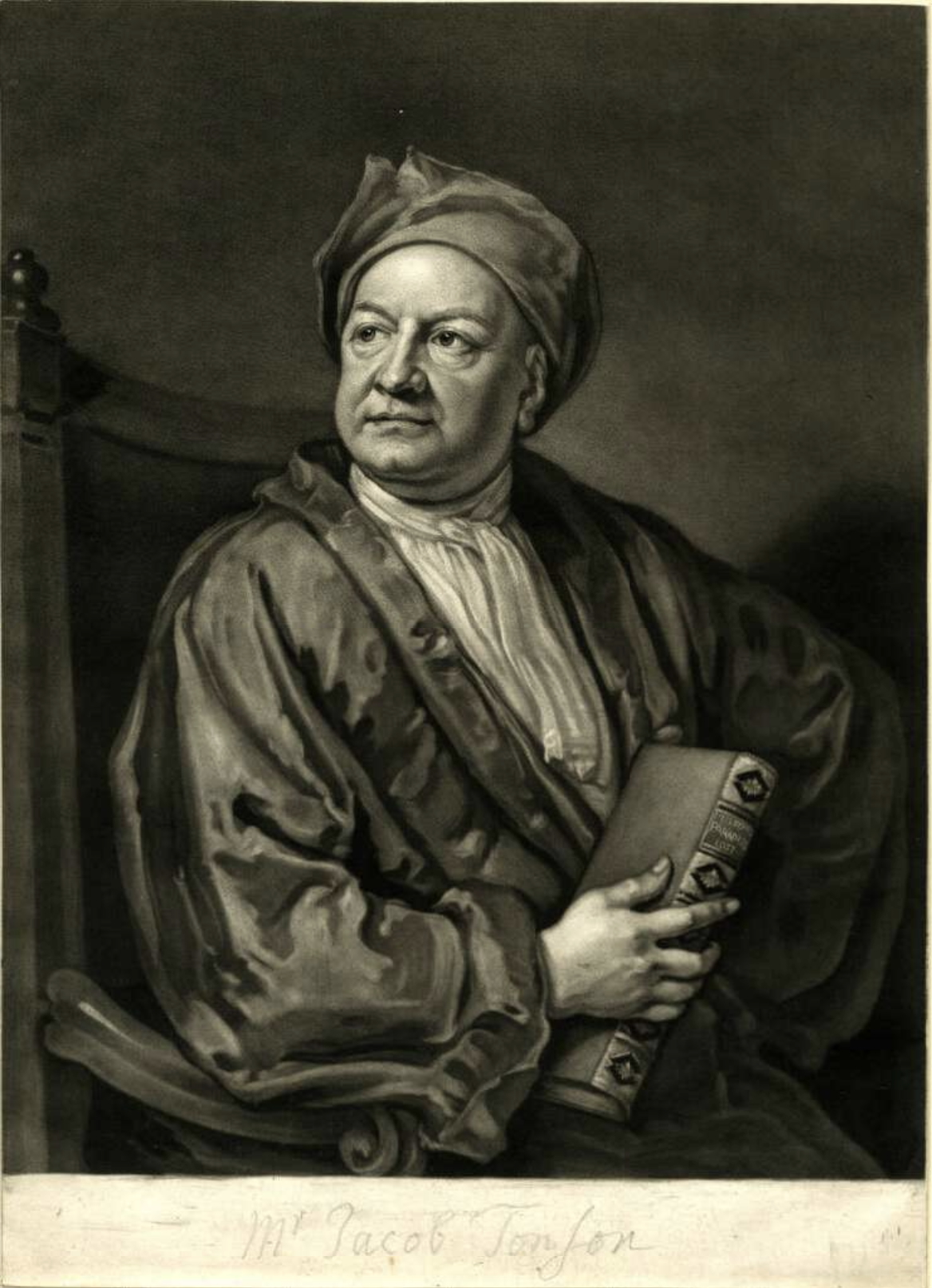
Mezzotint portrait of Jacob Tonson by John Faber the Younger after Sir Godfrey Kneller, 1733. Chaloner Smith 1883; British Mezzotinto portraits from the introduction of the art to the early part of the present century # 208.43. British Museum

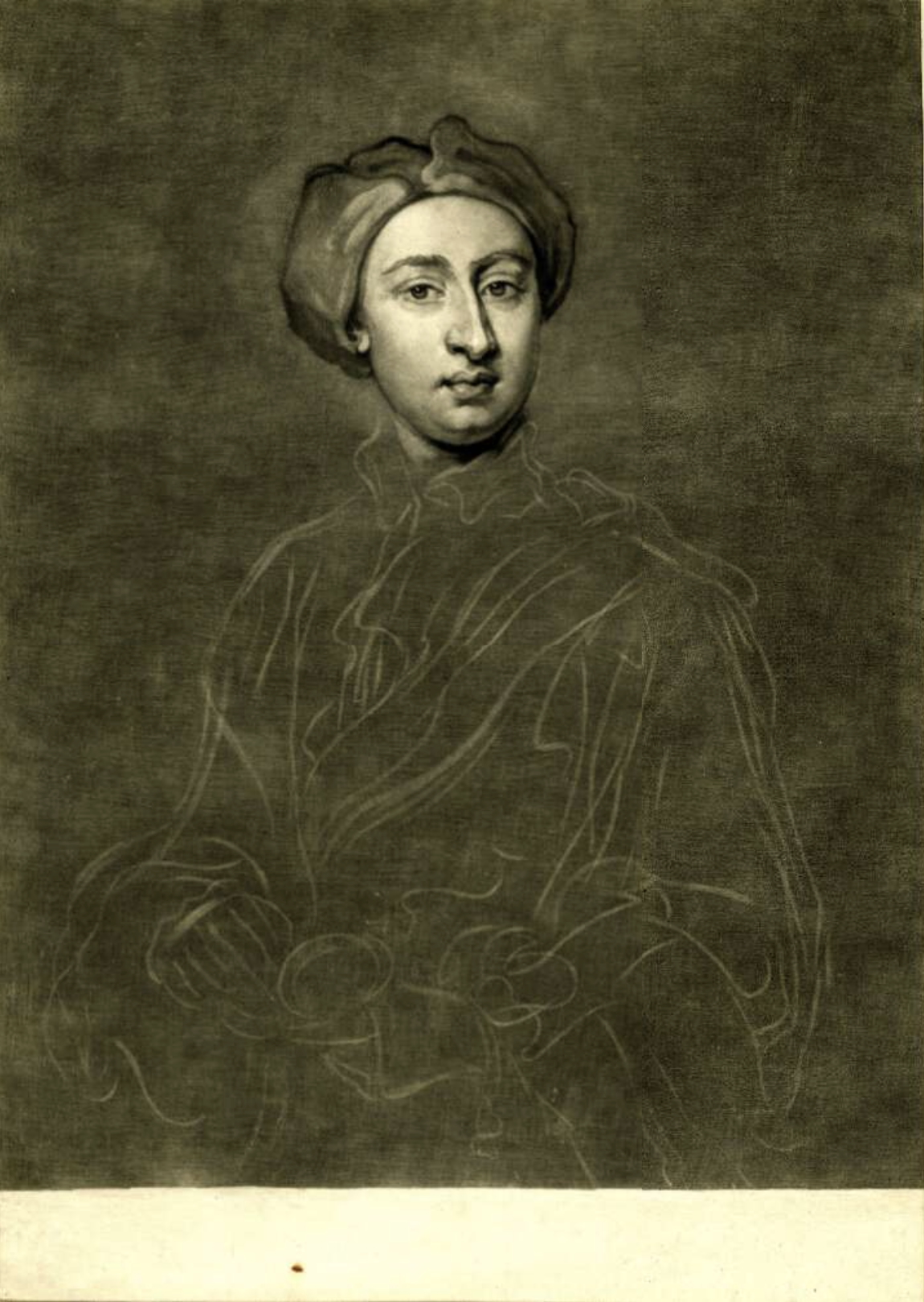
Mezzotint portrait of Theophilus Hasting, Earl of Huntingdon by John Faber the Younger after Sir Godfrey Kneller, 1733 Chaloner Smith 1883; British Mezzotinto portraits from the introduction of the art to the early part of the present century # 208.12. British Museum

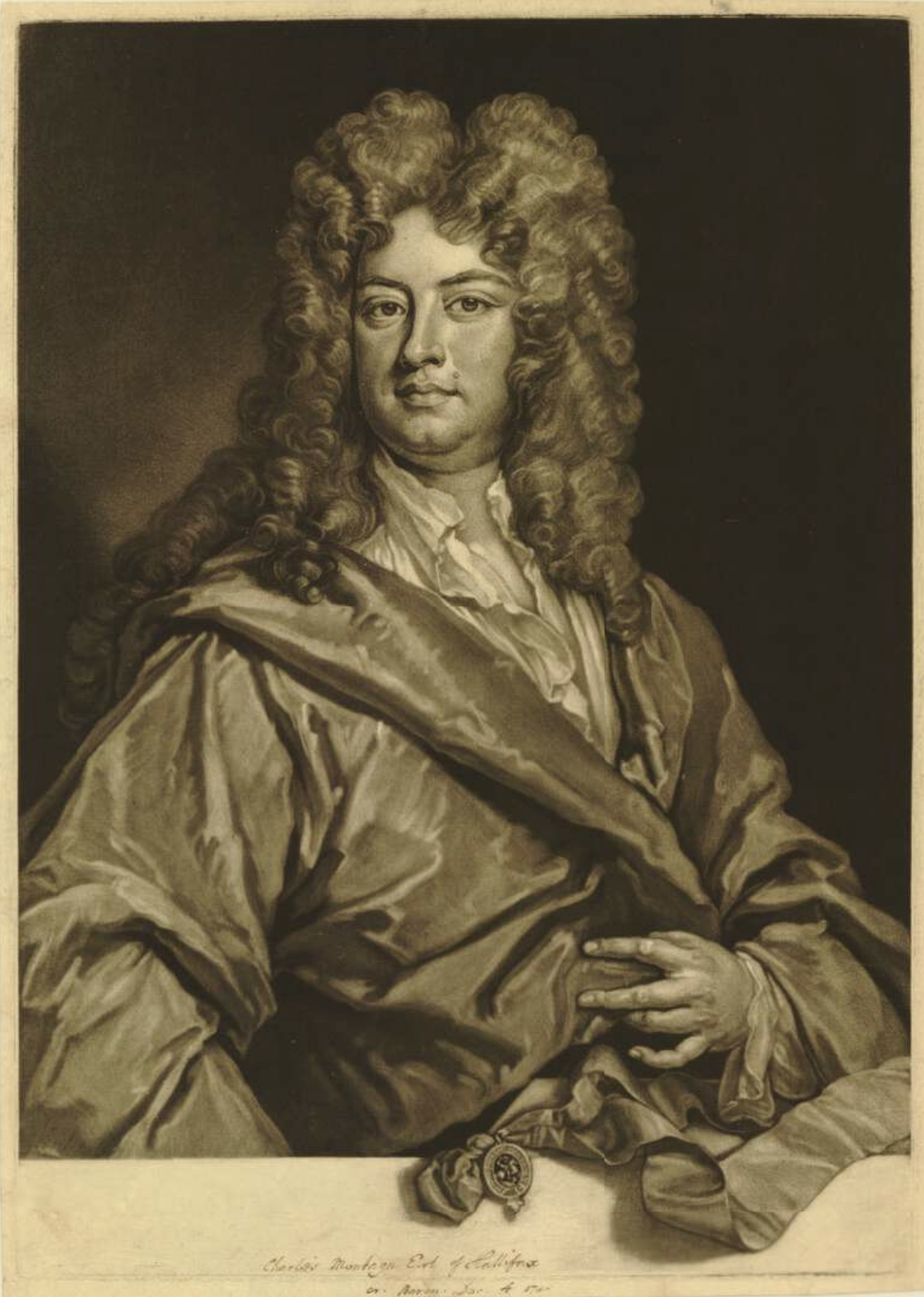
Mezzotint portrait of Charles Montagu, Earl of Halifax by John Faber the Younger after Sir Godfrey Kneller, 1733 Chaloner Smith 1883; British Mezzotinto portraits from the introduction of the art to the early part of the present century # 208.19. British Museum

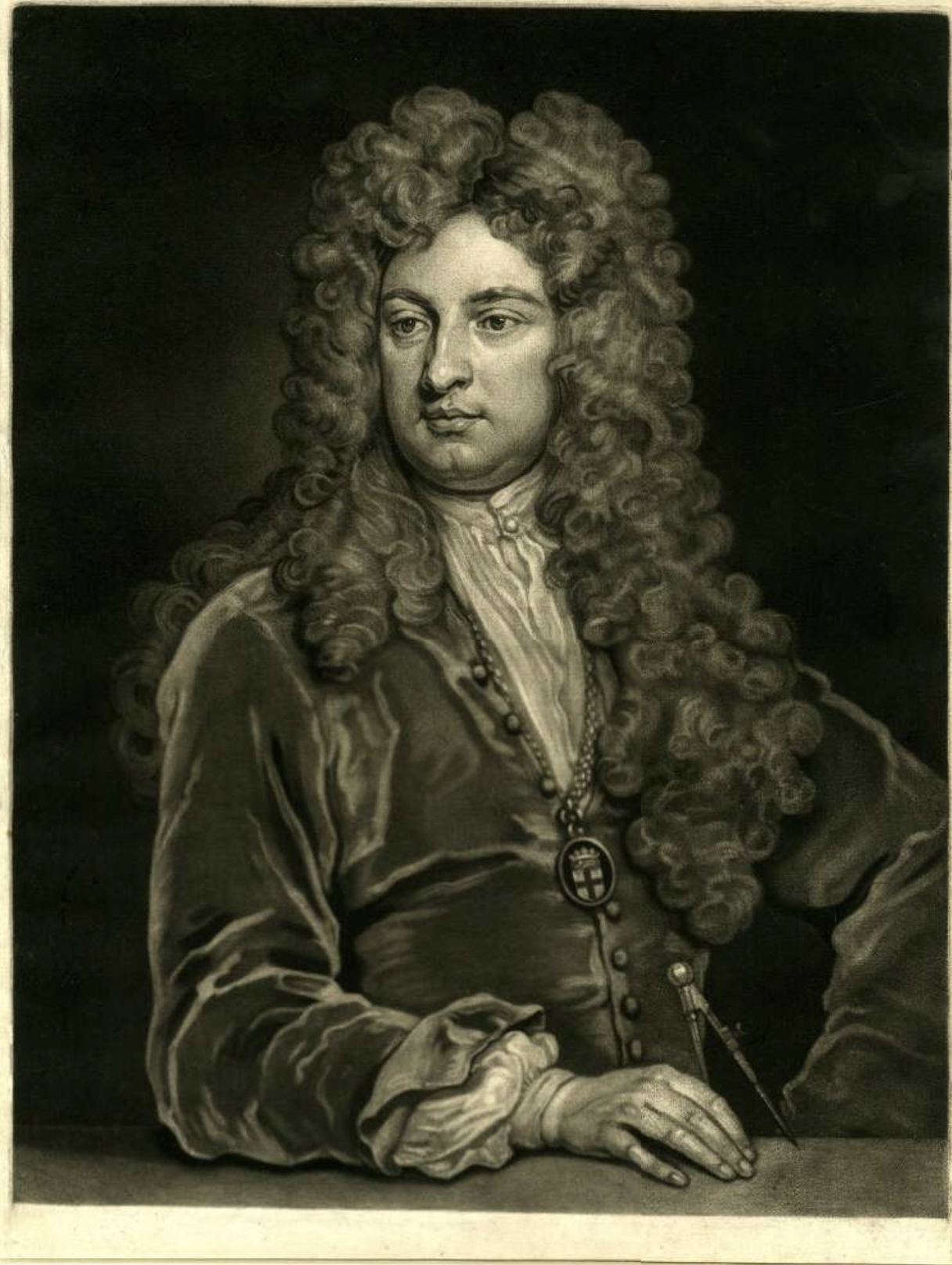
Mezzotint portrait of Sir John Vanbrugh by John Faber the Younger after Sir Godfrey Kneller, 1733. Chaloner Smith 1883; British Mezzotinto portraits from the introduction of the art to the early part of the present century # 208.29. British Museum

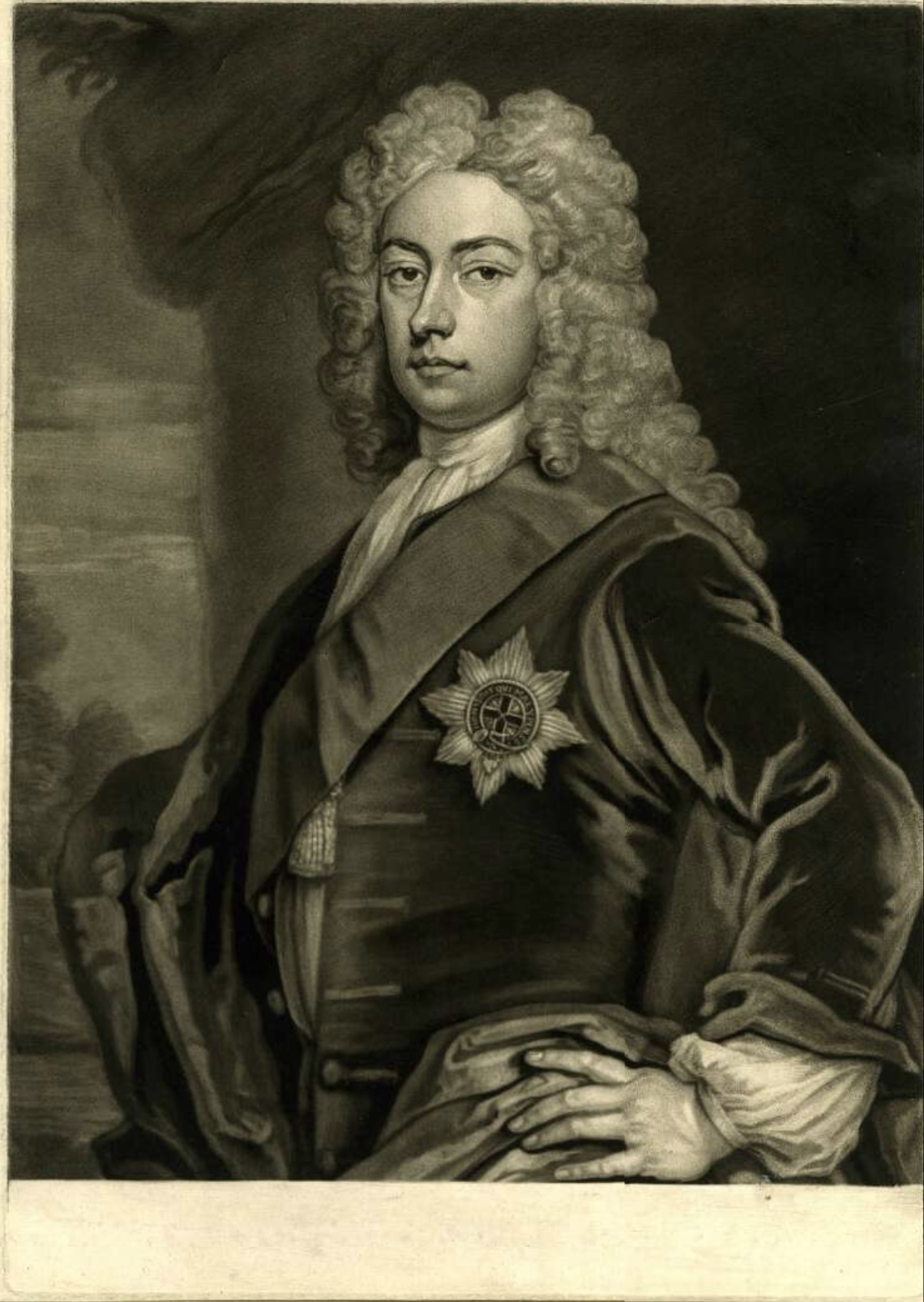
Mezzotint portrait of Richard Boyle, Earl of Burlington by John Faber the Younger after Sir Godfrey Kneller, 1733. Chaloner Smith 1883; British Mezzotinto portraits from the introduction of the art to the early part of the present century # 208.15-16. British Museum

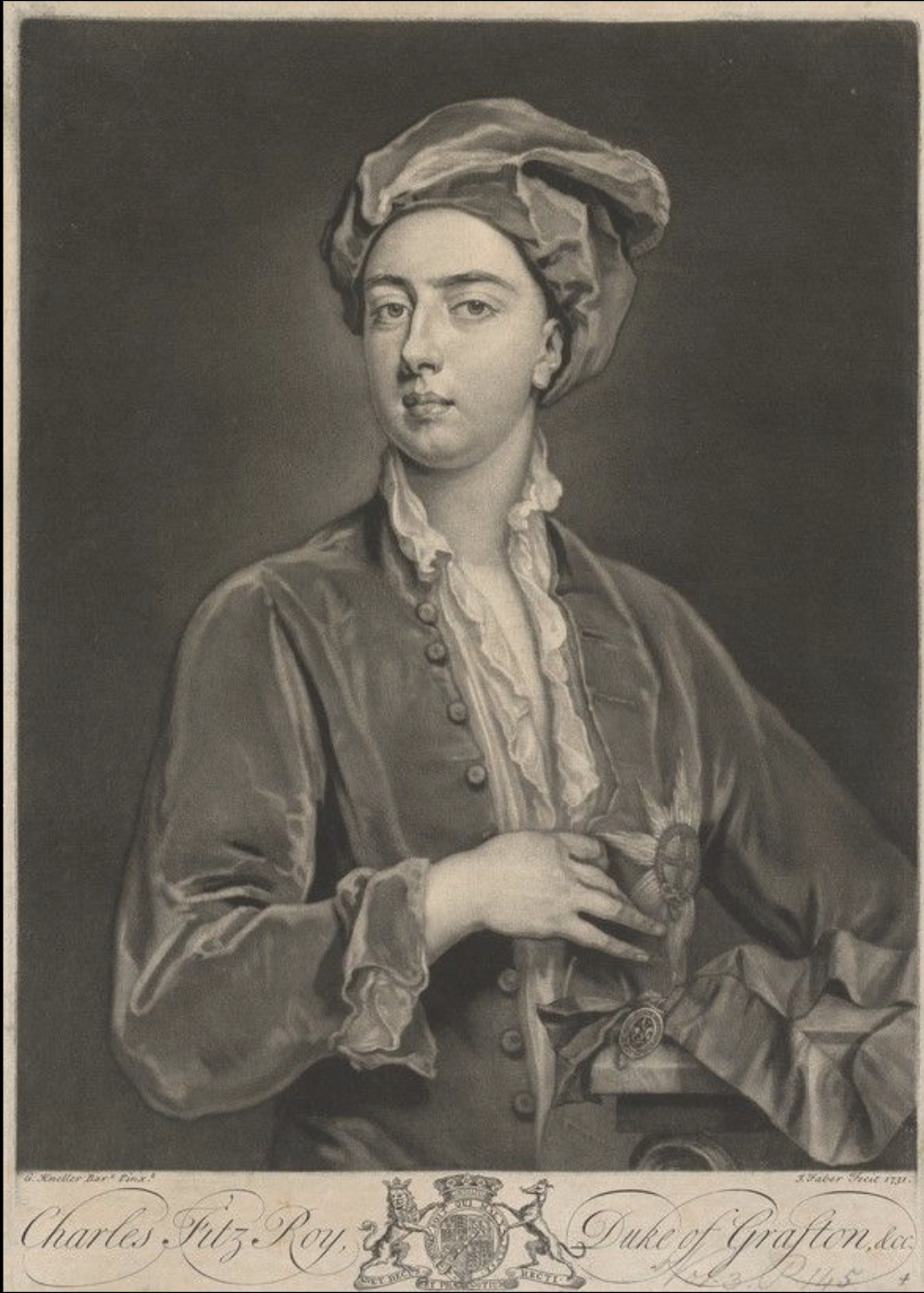
Mezzotint portrait of Charles FitzRoy, 2nd Duke of Grafton by John Faber the Younger after Sir Godfrey Kneller, 1733. Chaloner Smith 1883; British Mezzotinto portraits from the introduction of the art to the early part of the present century # 208.4 Yale Center for British Art

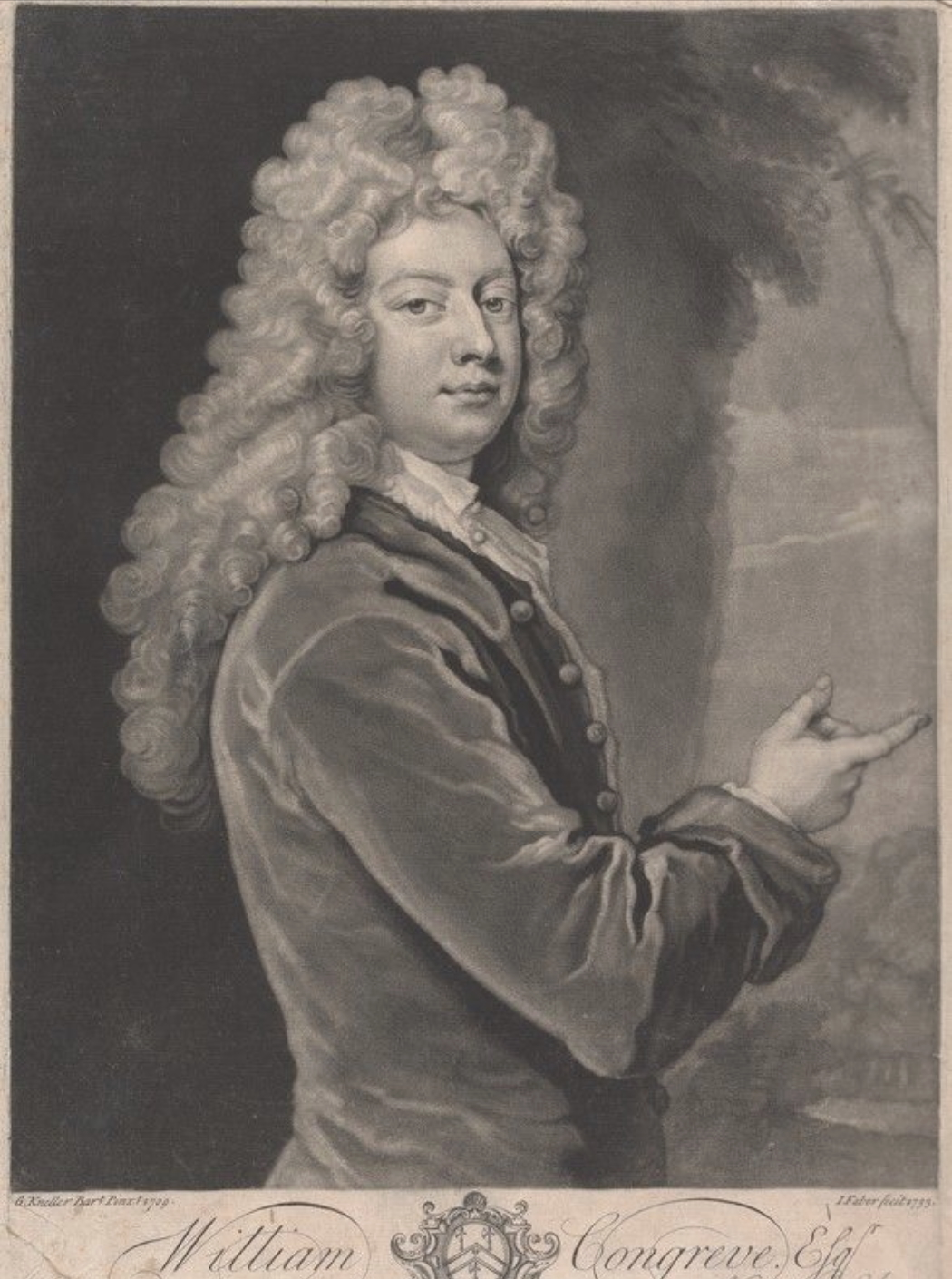
Mezzotint portrait of William Congreve Esq by John Faber the Younger after Sir Godfrey Kneller, 1733. Chaloner Smith 1883; British Mezzotinto portraits from the introduction of the art to the early part of the present century # 208.40 Yale Center for British Art

== See also ==
- The Scriblerian and the Kit-Cats

== References and sources ==
Sources

- Downes, Kerry (1987). Sir John Vanbrugh: A Biography. London: Sidgwick and Jackson.
- Hearne, Thomas (1705) Ductor historicus; or a short system of universal history 1698—ed. 2, augmented and improv'd 1704–05 (1714)
- Field, Ophelia (2008). The Kit-Kat Club, London: Harper.
- Swift, Jonathan D.D. (1727) The Works of Jonathan Swift, D.D., Containing Additional Letters &c. Volume XIII reprinted, Edinburgh: Walter Scott (1814)
