= Office of Works =

Department of building and maintenance of the English royal household

The Office of Works was an organisation responsible for structures and exterior spaces, first established as part of the English royal household in 1378 to oversee the building and maintenance of the royal castles and residences.

In 1832 it became the Works Department within the Office of Woods, Forests, Land Revenues, Works and Buildings. It was reconstituted as a government department in 1851, which in 1940 became part of the Ministry of Works.

== Organisation and key positions ==
=== Surveyor, Comptroller and Architect ===
The organisation of the office varied; senior posts included Surveyor of the King's Works (1560–1782) and Comptroller of the King's Works (1423–1782). In 1782 these offices were merged into Surveyor-General and Comptroller.

Comptroller of the King's Works	Surveyor of the King's Works
1423–1452 Robert Shiryngton; 1456–1461 Peter Idley; 1597–1606 Simon Basil; 1606–1641 Thomas Baldwin; 1641–1668 James Wethered; 1668–1684 Hugh May; 1689–1702 William Talman; 1702–1726 John Vanbrugh; 1726–1758 Thomas Ripley; 1758–1769 Henry Flitcroft; 1769–1782 William Chambers	1560–1563 John Revell.; 1563–1578 Lewis Stockett.; 1578–1586 Thomas Graves; 1586–1590 Thomas Blagrave; 1594–1595 Robert Adams; 1597–1604 William Spicer; 1604–1606 David Cunningham of Robertland; 1606–1615 Simon Basil; 1615–1643 Inigo Jones; 1643–1653 Edward Carter; 1653–1660 John Embree; 1660–1669 Sir John Denham; 1669–1718 Christopher Wren; 1718–1719 William Benson; 1719–1726 Sir Thomas Hewett; 1726–1737 Richard Arundell; 1737–1743 Henry Fox; 1743–1760 Henry Finch; 1760–1768 Thomas Worsley; 1779–1782 Whitshed Keene
Surveyor-General and Comptroller
1782–1796 William Chambers; 1796–1813 James Wyatt

After the death of the Surveyor-General and Comptroller James Wyatt in 1813, a non-professional Surveyor-General was appointed: Major-General Sir Benjamin Stephenson. He was assisted by three "Attached Architects": Sir John Soane, John Nash and Sir Robert Smirke. This arrangement ended in 1832 with the formation of the Works Department, when architect Henry Hake Seward was appointed Surveyor of Works and Buildings.

Other positions included Surveyor of the King's Private Roads, various roles with responsibility for gardens, and later, Deputy Surveyor.

Surveyor of the King's Private Roads	Surveyor of Royal Gardens	Deputy Surveyor
1660–1690 Andrew Lawrence; 1690–1715 Michael Studholme; 1716–1731 William Watkins; 1731–1737 Richard Arundell; 1737–1756 Thomas Ripley; 1756–1757 John Offley; 1757–1760 Sir Henry Erskine, 5th Baronet; 1760–1771 Hon. Edward Finch; 1771–1772 Thomas Whateley; 1772–1782 Hon. Henry Fane	1660–1670 Adrian May; 1670–1684 Hugh May	1718–1719 Colen Campbell (dismissed); 1719–1735 Westby Gill (promoted); 1735–1748 William Kent (died in post); 1748–1758 Henry Flitcroft (promoted); 1758–1780 Stephen Wright (died in post); 1780–1782 Robert Taylor
1660–1690 Andrew Lawrence; 1690–1715 Michael Studholme; 1716–1731 William Watkins; 1731–1737 Richard Arundell; 1737–1756 Thomas Ripley; 1756–1757 John Offley; 1757–1760 Sir Henry Erskine, 5th Baronet; 1760–1771 Hon. Edward Finch; 1771–1772 Thomas Whateley; 1772–1782 Hon. Henry Fane	Superintendent of all the King's Gardens	1718–1719 Colen Campbell (dismissed); 1719–1735 Westby Gill (promoted); 1735–1748 William Kent (died in post); 1748–1758 Henry Flitcroft (promoted); 1758–1780 Stephen Wright (died in post); 1780–1782 Robert Taylor
1660–1690 Andrew Lawrence; 1690–1715 Michael Studholme; 1716–1731 William Watkins; 1731–1737 Richard Arundell; 1737–1756 Thomas Ripley; 1756–1757 John Offley; 1757–1760 Sir Henry Erskine, 5th Baronet; 1760–1771 Hon. Edward Finch; 1771–1772 Thomas Whateley; 1772–1782 Hon. Henry Fane	1689–1700 William Bentinck, 1st Earl of Portland; 1700–1702 Richard Jones, 1st Earl of Ranelagh	1718–1719 Colen Campbell (dismissed); 1719–1735 Westby Gill (promoted); 1735–1748 William Kent (died in post); 1748–1758 Henry Flitcroft (promoted); 1758–1780 Stephen Wright (died in post); 1780–1782 Robert Taylor
1660–1690 Andrew Lawrence; 1690–1715 Michael Studholme; 1716–1731 William Watkins; 1731–1737 Richard Arundell; 1737–1756 Thomas Ripley; 1756–1757 John Offley; 1757–1760 Sir Henry Erskine, 5th Baronet; 1760–1771 Hon. Edward Finch; 1771–1772 Thomas Whateley; 1772–1782 Hon. Henry Fane	Surveyor of Gardens and Waters	1718–1719 Colen Campbell (dismissed); 1719–1735 Westby Gill (promoted); 1735–1748 William Kent (died in post); 1748–1758 Henry Flitcroft (promoted); 1758–1780 Stephen Wright (died in post); 1780–1782 Robert Taylor
1660–1690 Andrew Lawrence; 1690–1715 Michael Studholme; 1716–1731 William Watkins; 1731–1737 Richard Arundell; 1737–1756 Thomas Ripley; 1756–1757 John Offley; 1757–1760 Sir Henry Erskine, 5th Baronet; 1760–1771 Hon. Edward Finch; 1771–1772 Thomas Whateley; 1772–1782 Hon. Henry Fane	1715–1726 John Vanbrugh; 1726–1737 Charles Dartiquenave; 1738–1760 Thomas Hervey; 1761–1763 George Onslow, 1st Earl of Onslow; 1763–1763 Lord Charles Spencer; 1763–1764 John Marshe Dickinson; 1764–1769 Charles Cadogan, 1st Earl Cadogan; 1770–1782 William Varey	1718–1719 Colen Campbell (dismissed); 1719–1735 Westby Gill (promoted); 1735–1748 William Kent (died in post); 1748–1758 Henry Flitcroft (promoted); 1758–1780 Stephen Wright (died in post); 1780–1782 Robert Taylor

=== Administrative positions ===
Paymaster of the Works	Secretary to the Board of Works
1660–1668 Hugh May; 1668–1686 Philip Packer; 1686–1706 Thomas Lloyd; 1706–1726 Charles Dartiquenave; 1726–1738 Hugh Howard; 1738–1741 John Harris; 1741–1742 Sir Robert Brown, 1st Baronet; 1742–1743 Sir Charles Gilmour, 2nd Baronet; 1743–1755 Denzil Onslow; 1755–1782 George Augustus Selwyn	1715–1718 Nicholas Hawksmoor; 1718–1719 Benjamin Benson; 1719–1726 John Hallam; 1726–1736 Nicholas Hawksmoor; 1736–1766 Isaac Ware; 1766–1775 William Robinson; 1775–1782 Kenton Couse

The office also had posts of Secretary, Master Mason and Master Carpenter.

== Sources ==
- H. M. Colvin, A Biographical Dictionary of British Architects, 1600-1840 (1997) ISBN 0-300-07207-4
- H. M. Colvin, The History of the King's Works, London: H.M.S.O. (1963–1982)
  - ISBN 0-11-670571-X
  - ISBN 0-11-670568-X (v.3, pt 1)
  - ISBN 0-11-670832-8 (v.4, pt 2)
  - ISBN 0-11-670571-X (v.5)
  - ISBN 0-11-670286-9 (v.6)
  - ISBN 0-11-671116-7 (Plans 5-7)
