= The Inverkeithing stone =

The Inverkeithing Stone
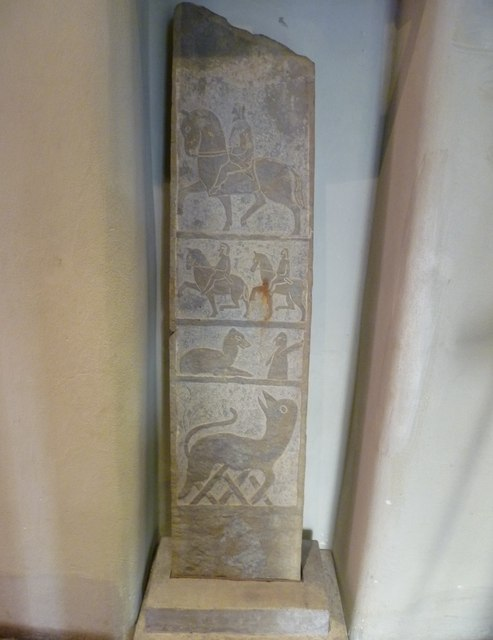
- The Inverkeithing Stone (replica).
- Type: standing stone
- Height: 10ft
- Symbols: hunting party on horseback; mythical or heraldic beast.
- Created: c. 8th or 9th century
- Discovered: Inverkeithing
- Culture: Picts

The Inverkeithing stone was a Class III Pictish standing stone dating to around the 8th or 9th century. The stone stood in Inverkeithing in Fife, Scotland until 1835.

== Description ==
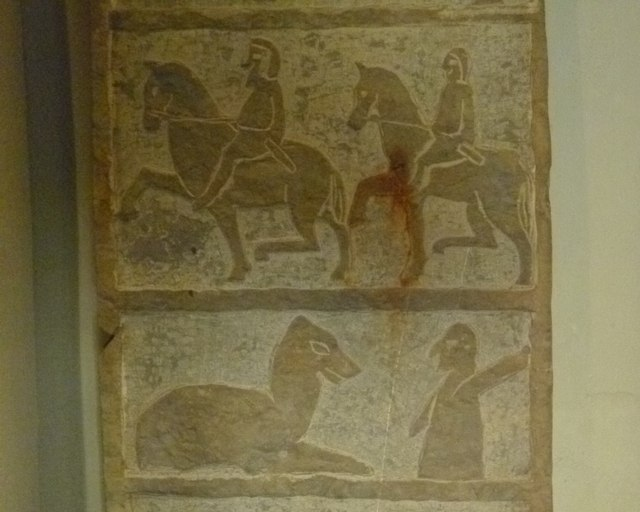
Panels of hunters on horseback (above) and man going for the kill (below).

The Inverkeithing stone was a pictorial stone, 10 feet in height, likely dating from the 8th or 9th century. It showed a hunting party on horseback, with a man making the kill. Beneath was a carving of a mythological or heraldic beast with a bird's beak, six legs and two tails.

McEwan and Amos (1995) hypothesise the beast could symbolise the merging of the two heraldic signs, as can be found on modern Coats of Arms where the emblems of the husband and wife have been integrated.

It is unclear why the stone was carved. It may have been as a boundary marker; or a memorial to a battle; or could have commemorated an event or burial. Robertson (1794), speculated the stone was a grave marker made after the Danish invasion of Fife in 1033-44.

There is dispute about a potential religious significance of the Inverkeithing stone; the University of St Andrews' Sacred Landscape Project (2022) suggests there is no evidence the stone was religious, whereas McEwan and Amos (1995) claim an elaborate Celtic cross would have been carved on the reverse side.

Following Allen and Anderson's classifications in The Early Christian Monuments of Scotland (1903), the Inverkeithing stone is Class III.

== History ==
Inverkeithing may have been an important Pict settlement; Taylor (2006) notes that the name Inverkeithing probably contains the Pictish word "coet", meaning "wood".

As a Class III Pictish stone, the stone was likely carved in the 8th or 9th century.

The original stone was destroyed in 1835, to make way for road improvements.

The Inverkeithing stone appears illustrated in John Stuart's The sculptured stones of Scotland (Aberdeen, 1856).

In the 20th century, sculptor Leslie Alan Reid carved a half-size replica of the Inverkeithing stone for Abbot House, Dunfermline.
