= Viewfield House, Dunfermline =

Viewfield House
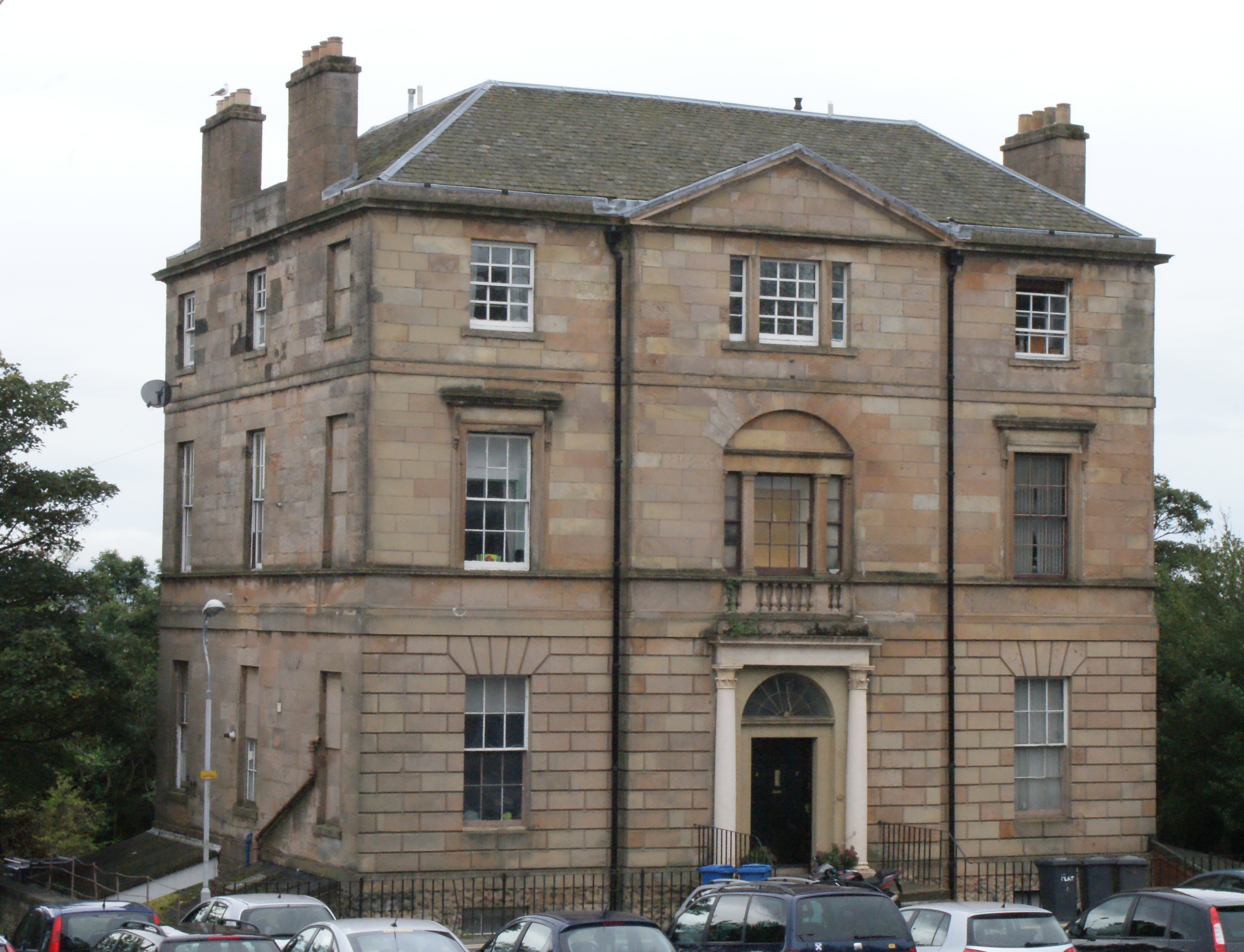
- Viewfield House
- Interactive map of Viewfield House
- Location: Viewfield Terrace, Dunfermline, Fife KY12 7JT
- Coordinates: 56.0711°N 3.4549°W
- Built: ca 1808–1810
- Architectural styles: Palladian exterior Adamesque interior

Listed Building – Category B
- Designated: 1 February 1971
- Reference no.: 26019

Viewfield House is a large square stone built three storey Palladian villa in Dunfermline, Fife, Scotland. It is a category B listed building.

== History ==
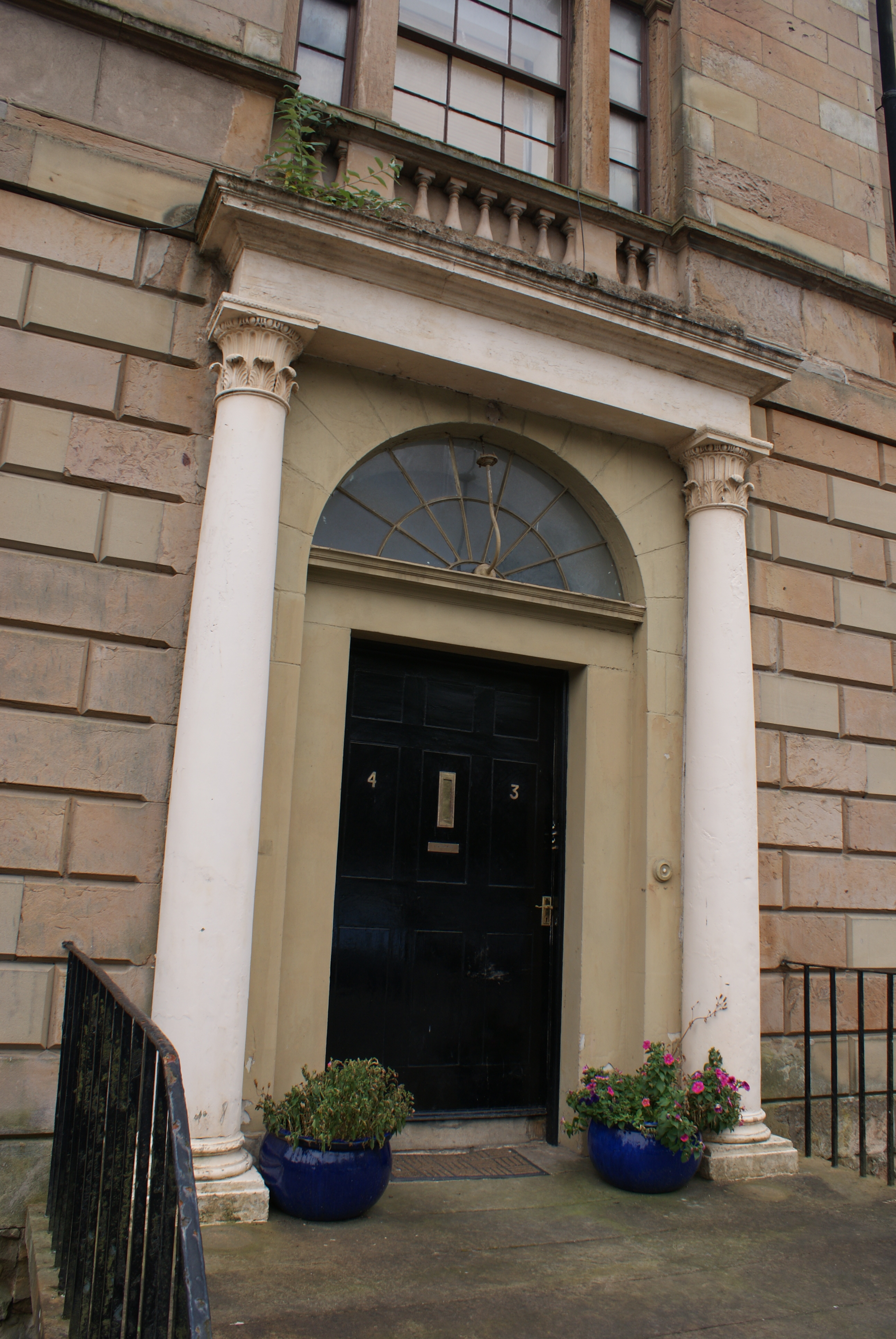
The front doorway

=== Provost's villa ===
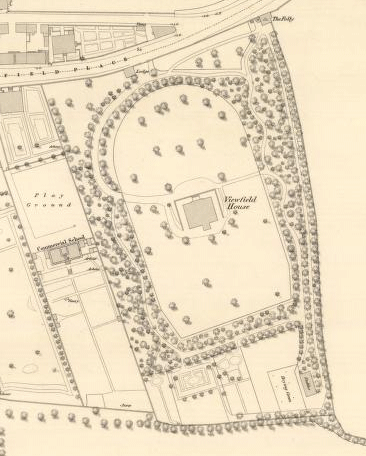
Viewfield House had a substantial park in 1854

Viewfield House was built in about 1808 for James Blackwood, Provost of Dunfermline, (Note: James, born about 1764, was eldest son of John Blackwood, merchant in Dunfermline and his second wife, Margaret Wyld. He died aged 65. Dunfermline Deeds 1700–1884) but has been altered repeatedly since then. It consists of three storeys with a pitched roof of grey slate, flat in the centre, containing an attic. The house has three bays: the central bay has a shallowly projecting pediment. There are Palladian windows on the first floor. The house is built of sandstone in ashlar blocks, the ground floor has a rusticated exterior and the basement is rockfaced.

The front of the house faces north. There are steps up to the front door which is flanked by a pair of white columns. The architectural academic, John Gifford, writing of the house in the Fife volume of The Buildings of Scotland, describes the doorcase as being modelled on The Tower of the Winds in Athens. Above the door is a semicircular fanlight; the columns support a heavy entablature.

Inside the house, the entrance lobby has decorative plasterwork in Adam style including roundels, fan vaulting and an oval ceiling. At the back there is a dogleg staircase which has a cast iron balustrade; above this is an octagonal lantern.

Viewfield House had substantial grounds surrounded by trees in the nineteenth century, as shown on J. Wood's 1823 town plan, and (illustrated) the 1854 Ordnance Survey 1:1056 map, which also shows the staircase extension on the south side of the house.

=== Later owners ===
James Blackwood died in 1829. By 1828, Viewfield House already belonged to a Mrs Anderson; Mercer recorded that "This pleasant villa... stands in a fine park, adorned with plantations and shrubberies, and is the principal ornament of the eastern approaches to the town." By 1841, Viewfield House was occupied by the family of John Finlay, a merchant of Dunfermline who had become wealthy in Calcutta, leaving his mother Henrietta Mackay and sister Agnes in Viewfield. A Benjamin Hobson Carroll lived in Viewfield in 1884.

=== Carnegie Trust Craft School ===
Woodwork Room of Craft School in Viewfield House, 1928

The house was bought by the Carnegie Trust in 1915, and served as home to the Carnegie Trust's Craft School from 1920. The School had previously been housed in the Carnegie Women's Institute (from 1912) and before that in Abbot House.

In Viewfield, the Craft School offered classes in furniture making, metalwork, house painting and decorating, illustrating, writing with traditional quill pens, plaster and clay modelling, leatherworking, and embroidery. These were taught by five full-time day staff and three part-time evening class instructors. Each year, students' work was shown at an annual exhibition in the Old Carnegie Baths building, Pilmuir Hall.

The house was used by the WRNS from 1940 to 1945. It was returned to the Trust after the war, but closed in 1963. Some of its students set up the Dunfermline Arts and Crafts Guild to continue running the house; it carried on teaching craft classes until 1980. The house was split into flats in 1982.
