= James Norval (businessman) =

British photographer (1862–1936)

Sir James Norval FRPS
- Born: August 17, 1862; Dundee, Scotland, United Kingdom
- Died: August 13, 1936 (aged 73); Skibo Castle, Scotland
- Occupation: Businessman
- Known for: Founded one of the earliest and largest photographic companies in the United Kingdom
- Spouse: Marion Fotheringham Whyte

Sir James Norval FRPS (1862–1936) was a late 19th- and early 20th-century British businessman who founded Norval Photography, one of the earliest and largest photographic companies. The firm was involved in both studio work and the processing of privately taken photographs, helping to enable the widespread use of cameras by people without access to darkrooms.

He also served as Provost of Dunfermline 1918 to 1924.

== Early life ==
He was born in Dundee on 17 August 1862.

== Career ==
He was apprenticed as a photographer to Handu, Hardie and Federwitz on North Station Road in Dunfermline around 1876.

In 1879 he took over his previous employer's premises and in 1885 he renamed it as Norval Photography. The company expanded in 1894 and moved to 123 New Row. Around this time they began to offer processing services to other photographers, the first step to bringing photography to all people, not just professionals. In 1895 he was elected a Fellow of the Royal Photographic Society.

He joined Dunfermline Town Council in 1902 and became involved in the Planning function, befriending Patrick Geddes in Edinburgh.

== Recognition ==
He was knighted by King George V in 1936 a few months before he died.

== Personal life and death ==
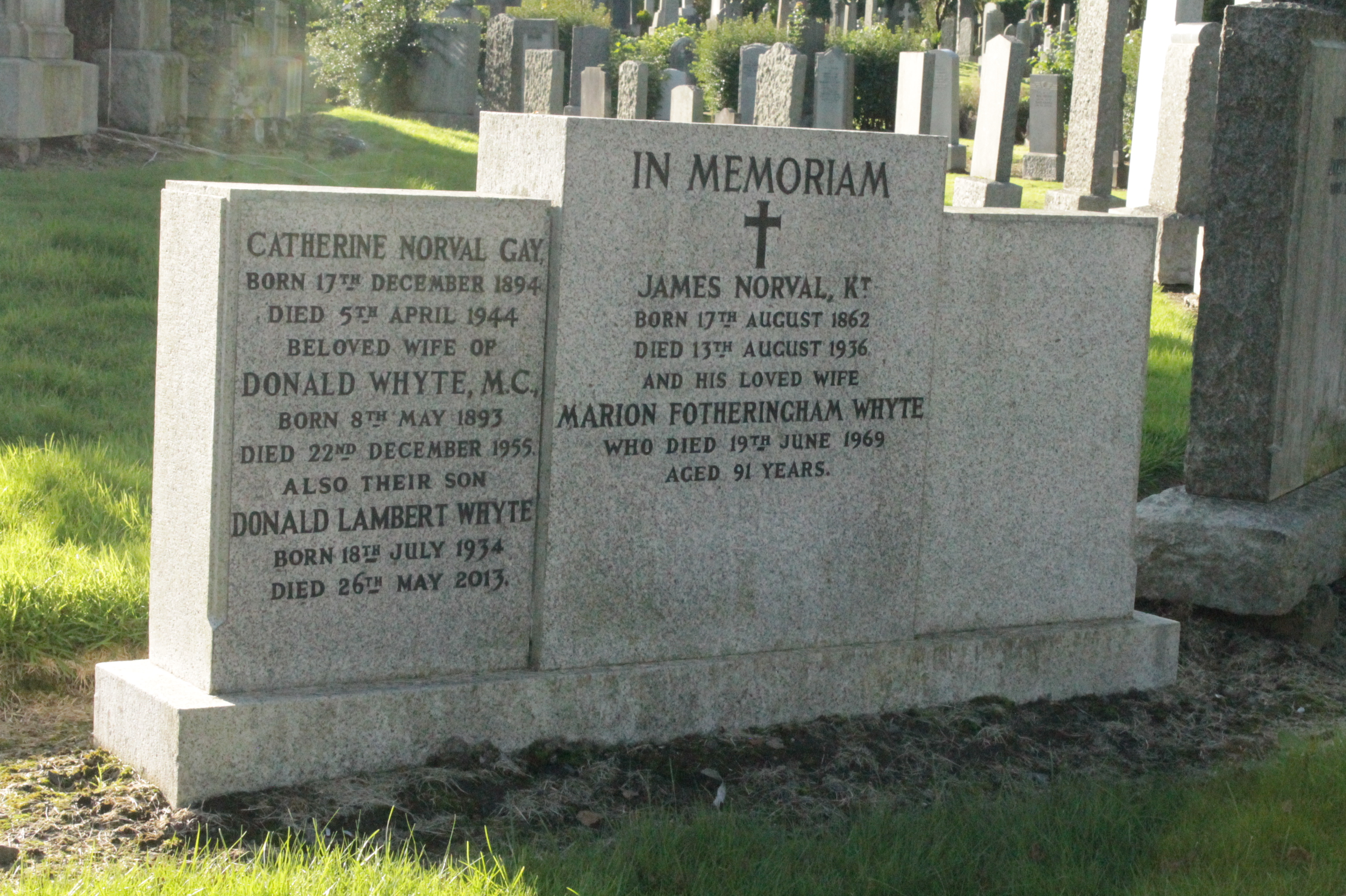
The grave of Sir James Norval, Dunfermline Cemetery

He was married to Marion Fotheringham Whyte (later known as Lady Norval) (1878-1969).

He died at Skibo Castle on 13 August 1936 whilst visiting his close friend Andrew Carnegie, and is buried in Dunfermline Cemetery. The grave lies on the east side of the eastmost roundel.

Norval Photography ceased to trade as a company in 2003, 118 years after its foundation. Its demise was primarily brought about by the advent of digital photography and severe drop in photo processing.
