= Radio West Fife =

Coordinates: 56°4′54.27″N 3°25′38.5″W

- Dunfermline; Scotland
- Broadcast area: Dunfermline and West Fife
- Frequencies: Digital radio (DAB+), online, smart speaker and mobile app
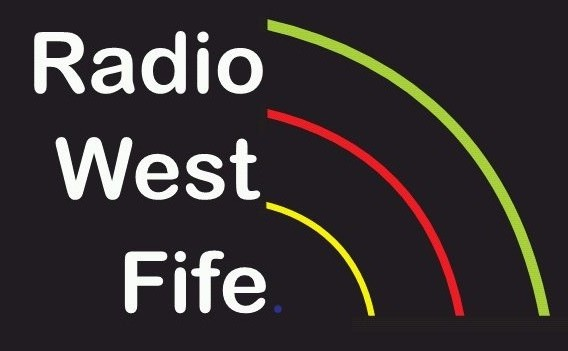
- Branding: Radio West Fife Logo

Links
- Website: http://radiowestfife.scot/

Radio West Fife is the Community radio station serving Dunfermline and West Fife. It launched on DAB+ on 31 August 2026 after 14 years as an online station. Radio West Fife broadcasts to a population of almost 225000 in Dunfermline, West Fife, Clackmannanshire, Stirling and Falkirk broadcasting on the Stirling and Falkirk multiplex. It is available online, on smart speakers and on the station's own mobile app.

== History ==
Radio West Fife was one of Scotland's earliest hospital radio stations broadcasting by landline to the Queen Margaret Hospital in Dunfermline.

It was initially broadcast from a shed in the grounds of the West Fife Hospital. The station has grown thanks to fundraising efforts of the members and through sponsorships.

Following a spell of broadcasting from a caravan at Milesmark Hospital, the station moved to the grounds of Lynebank Hospital in 1993.

The station began broadcasting online as a community radio station on 23 March 2012.

In May 2020, Radio West Fife was awarded an FM license from Ofcom. But due to issues arising from the pandemic this licence was surrendered. In October 2025 OFCOM awarded a licence to broadcast on DAB on the Stirling and Falkirk Multiples and the station has also been awarded a licence to broadcast on the South West Fife multiplex when it goes live in 2027

== Current facilities ==
Radio West Fife is currently based at Blairhall Community Centre, having moved from its studio in Rosyth and previously at Queen Margaret Hospital in 2019 due to re-development of facilities at the hospital. The station began broadcasting from Rosyth in February 2020.

Radio West Fife also broadcasts online on their website on their mobile app and on smart speakers.
