= Dunfermline =

City in Fife, Scotland

Dunfermline: Scottish Gaelic: Dùn Phàrlain; Scots: Dunfaurlin
- City
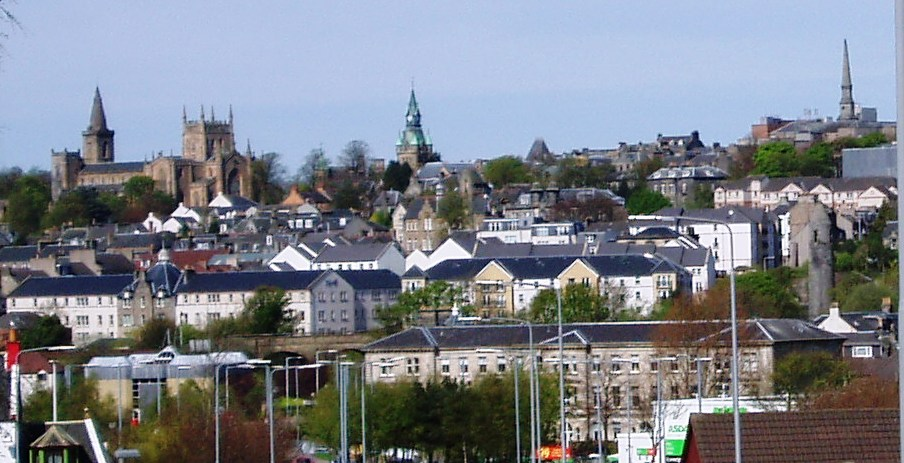
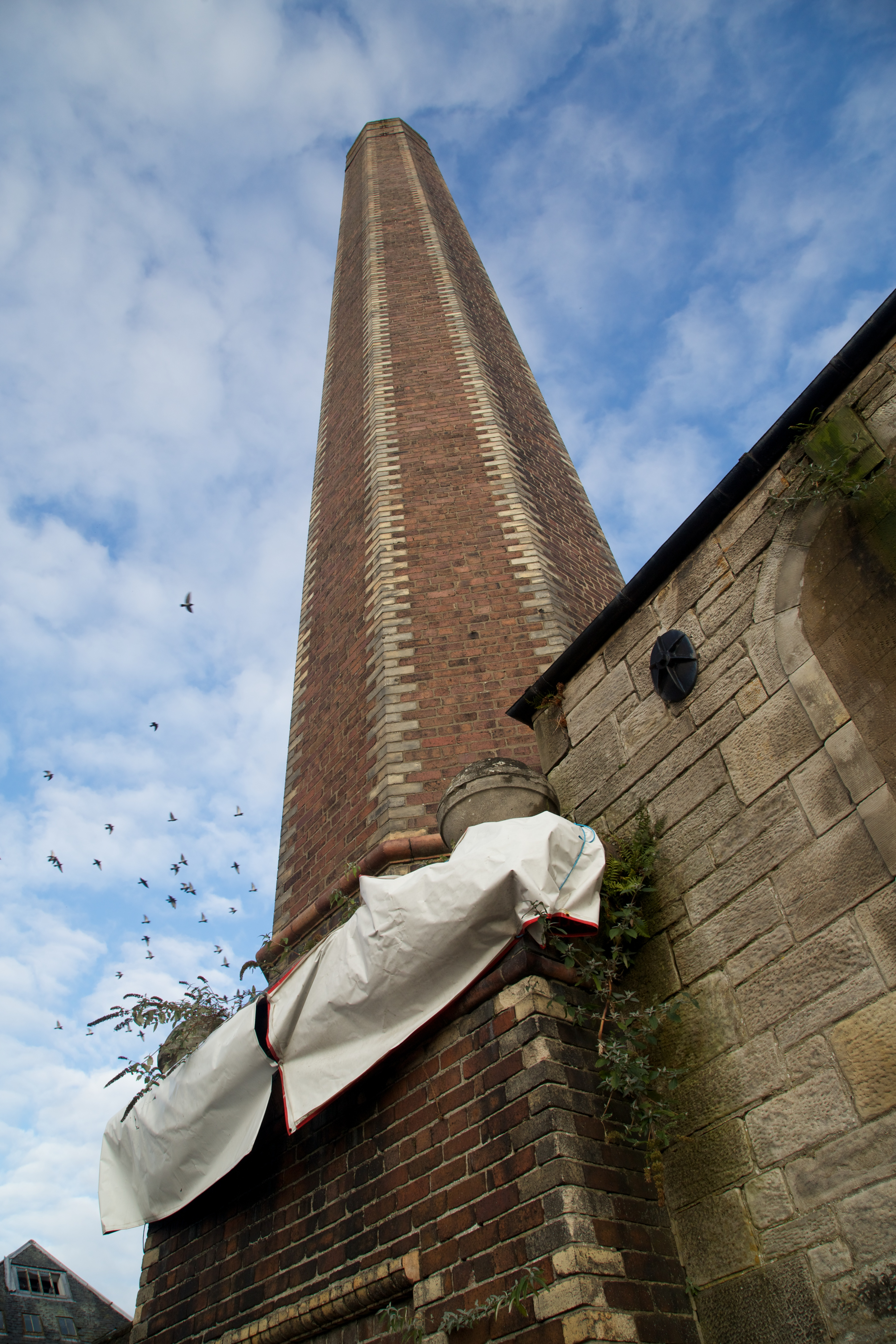
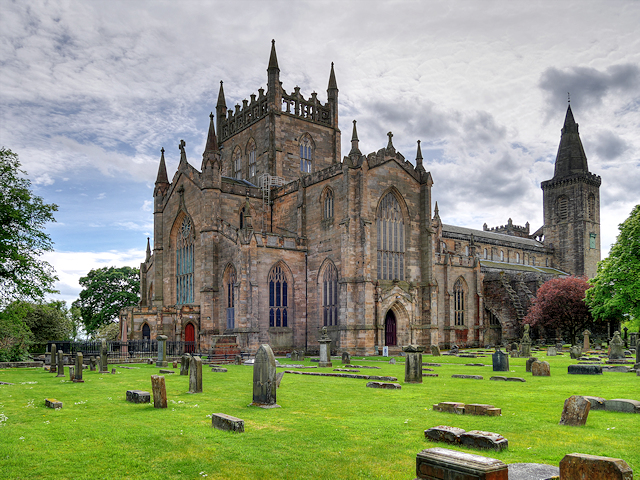
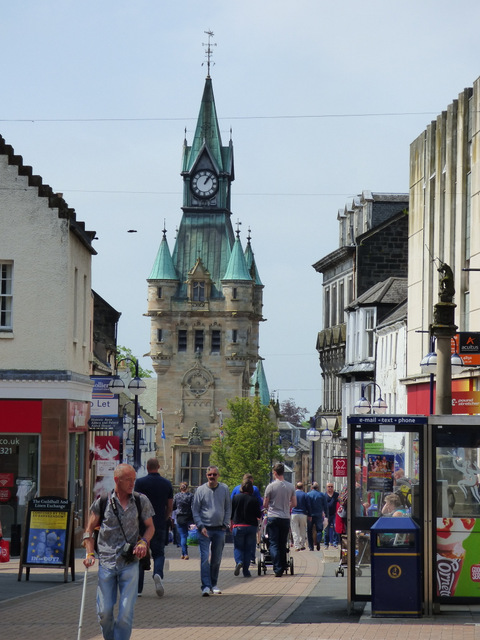
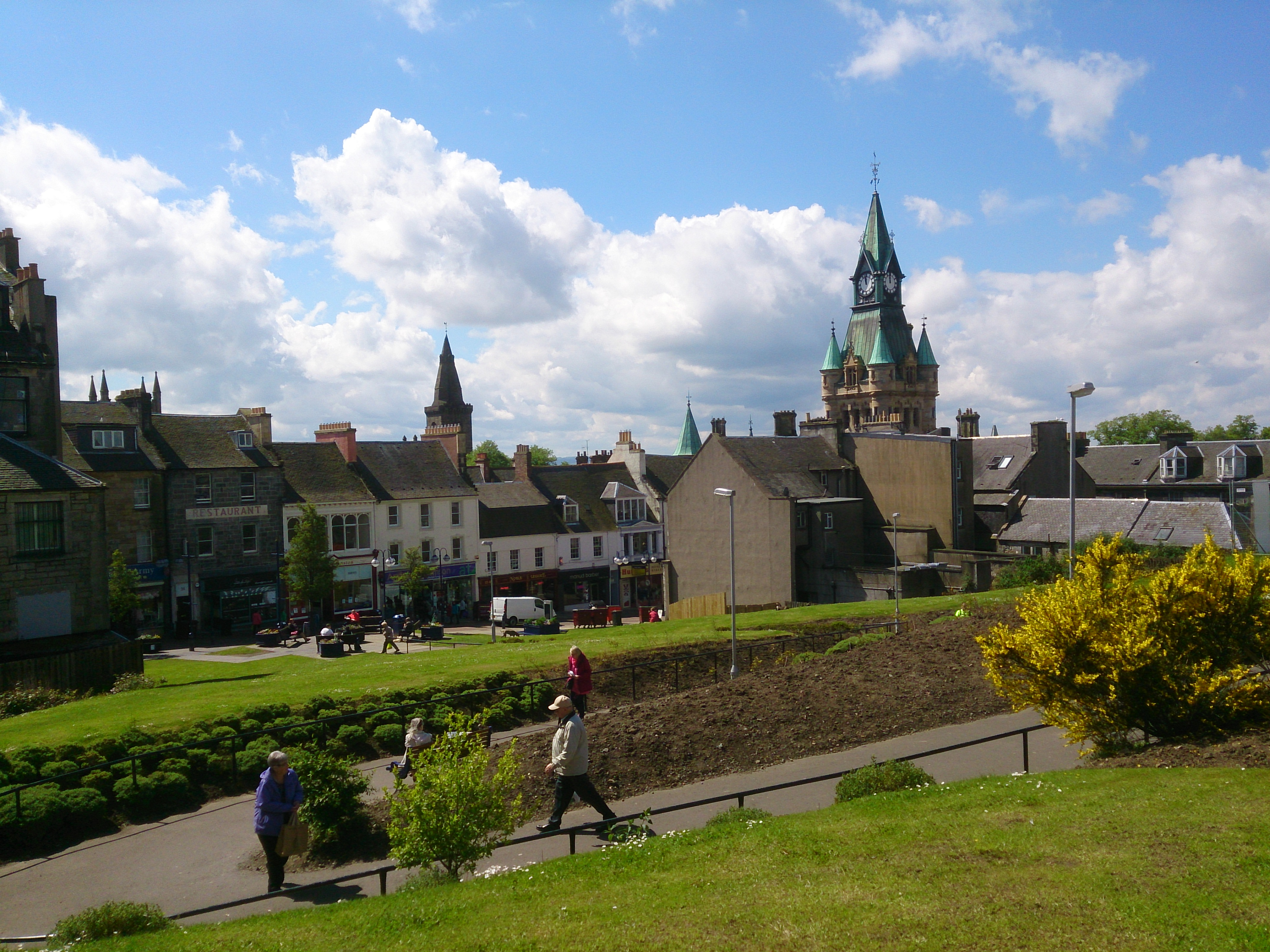
- Dunfermline Skyline Pilmuir Works Chimney Dunfermline Abbey Dunfermline City Chambers City Centre

- Location within Fife
- Population: 56,027 (2022)
- OS grid reference: NT105875
- Council area: Fife
- Lieutenancy area: Fife
- Country: Scotland
- Sovereign state: United Kingdom
- Post town: Dunfermline
- Postcode district: KY11, KY12
- Dialling code: 01383
- Police: Scotland
- Fire: Scottish
- Ambulance: Scottish
- UK Parliament: Dunfermline and Dollar
- Scottish Parliament: Dunfermline

Dunfermline (Note: /dʌnˈfɜːrmlɪn/; Scots: Dunfaurlin, Scottish Gaelic: Dùn Phàrlain) is a city, parish, and former royal burgh in Fife, Scotland, 3 miles (5 km) from the northern shore of the Firth of Forth. Dunfermline was the de facto capital of the Kingdom of Scotland between the 11th and 15th centuries.

The earliest known settlements around Dunfermline probably date to the Neolithic period, growing by the Bronze Age. The city was first recorded in the 11th century, with the marriage of Malcolm III of Scotland, and Saint Margaret at Dunfermline. As Queen consort, Margaret established a church dedicated to the Holy Trinity, which evolved into Dunfermline Abbey under their son David I in 1128, and became firmly established as a prosperous royal mausoleum for the Scottish Crown. A total of eighteen royals, including seven Kings, were buried here between 1093 and 1420 including Robert the Bruce in 1329.

By the 18th century, Dunfermline became a regional economic powerhouse with the introduction of the linen industry, and produced industrialists including Andrew Carnegie. Dunfermline was awarded city status as part of Elizabeth II's Platinum Jubilee Civic Honours in 2022. Today, the city is a major service centre, with the largest employers being Sky UK, Amazon, Best Western, TechnipFMC, Lloyds and Nationwide. Dunfermline sits on the Fife Pilgrim Way. In 2022, the locality had a population of 56,027, while the wider settlement had a population of 76,210.

== History ==
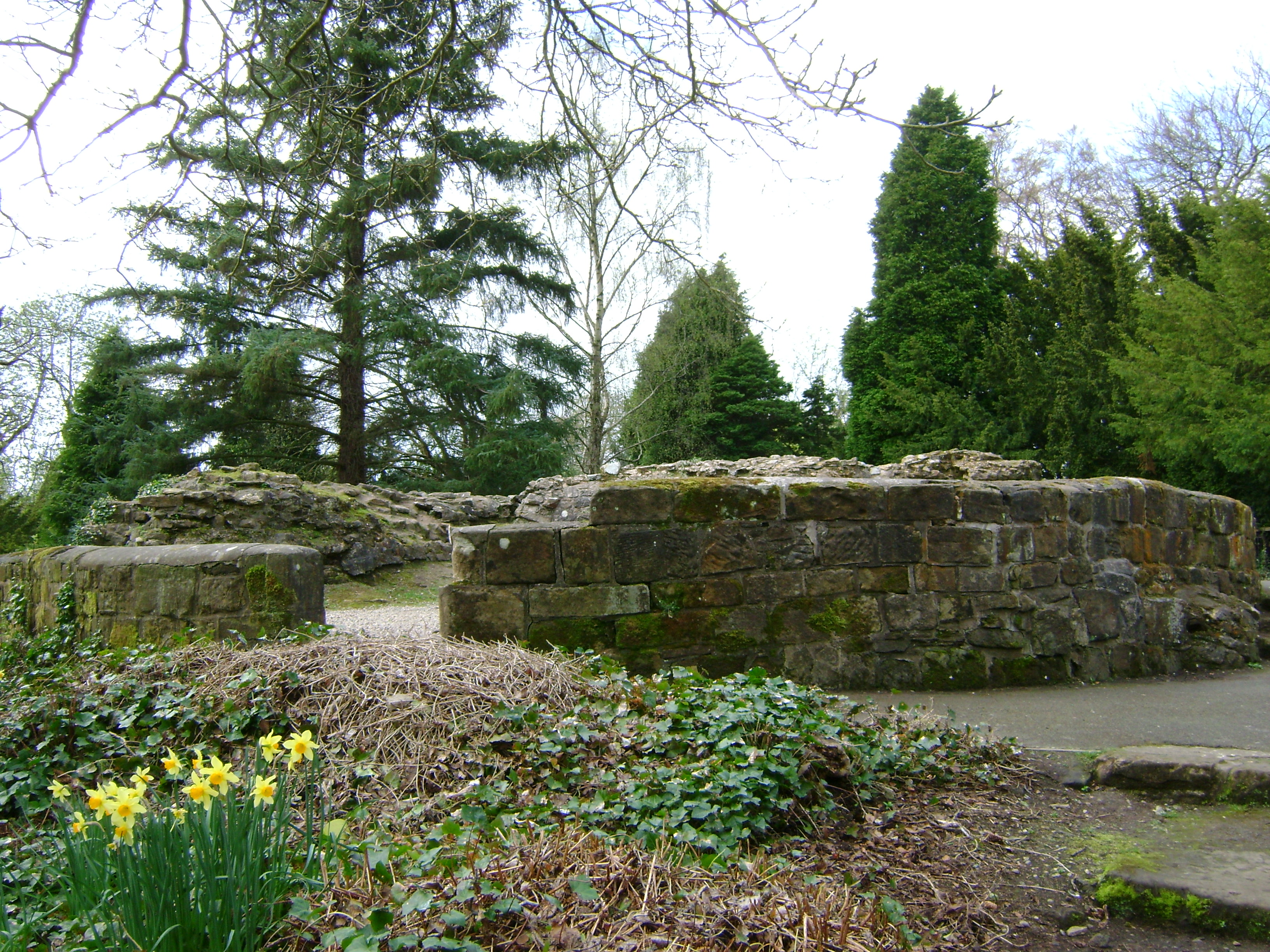
Remains of Malcolm Canmore's Tower

=== Early history ===
There have been various interpretations of the name, "Dunfermline". The first element, "dun" translated from Gaelic, has been accepted as a (fortified) hill, and is assumed to be referring to the rocky outcrop at the site of Malcolm Canmore's Tower in Pittencrieff Glen (now Pittencrieff Park). The rest of the name is problematic. The second element, the "ferm" may have been an alternative name for the Tower Burn according to a medieval record published in 1455 which, together with the Lyne Burn to the south, suggests the site of a fortification between these two watercourses.

The first record of a settlement in the Dunfermline area was in the Neolithic period. This evidence includes finds of a stone axe, some flint arrowheads and a carved stone ball near the town. A cropmark which is understood to have been used as a possible mortuary enclosure has been found at Deanpark House, also near the town. By the time of the Bronze Age, the area was beginning to show some importance. Important finds included a bronze axe in Wellwood and a gold torc from the Parish Churchyard. Cist burials from the Bronze Age have also been discovered at both Crossford and Masterton, the latter of which contains a pair of armlets, a bronze dagger and a set necklace believed to have complemented a double burial.

The first historic record for Dunfermline was made in the 11th century. According to the fourteenth-century chronicler, John of Fordun, Malcolm III married his second bride, the Anglo-Saxon princess Saint Margaret, at the church in Dunfermline between 1068 and 1070; the ceremony was performed by Fothad, the last Celtic bishop of St Andrews. Malcolm III established Dunfermline as a new seat for royal power in the mid-11th century and initiated changes that eventually made the township the de facto capital of Scotland for much of the period until the assassination of James I in 1437. Following her marriage to King Malcolm III, Queen Margaret encouraged her husband to convert the small culdee chapel into a church for Benedictine monks. The existing culdee church was no longer able to meet the demand for its growing congregation because of a large increase in the population of Dunfermline from the arrival of English nobility coming into Scotland. The founding of this new church of Dunfermline was inaugurated around 1072, but was not recorded in the town's records.

=== Capital of Scotland ===
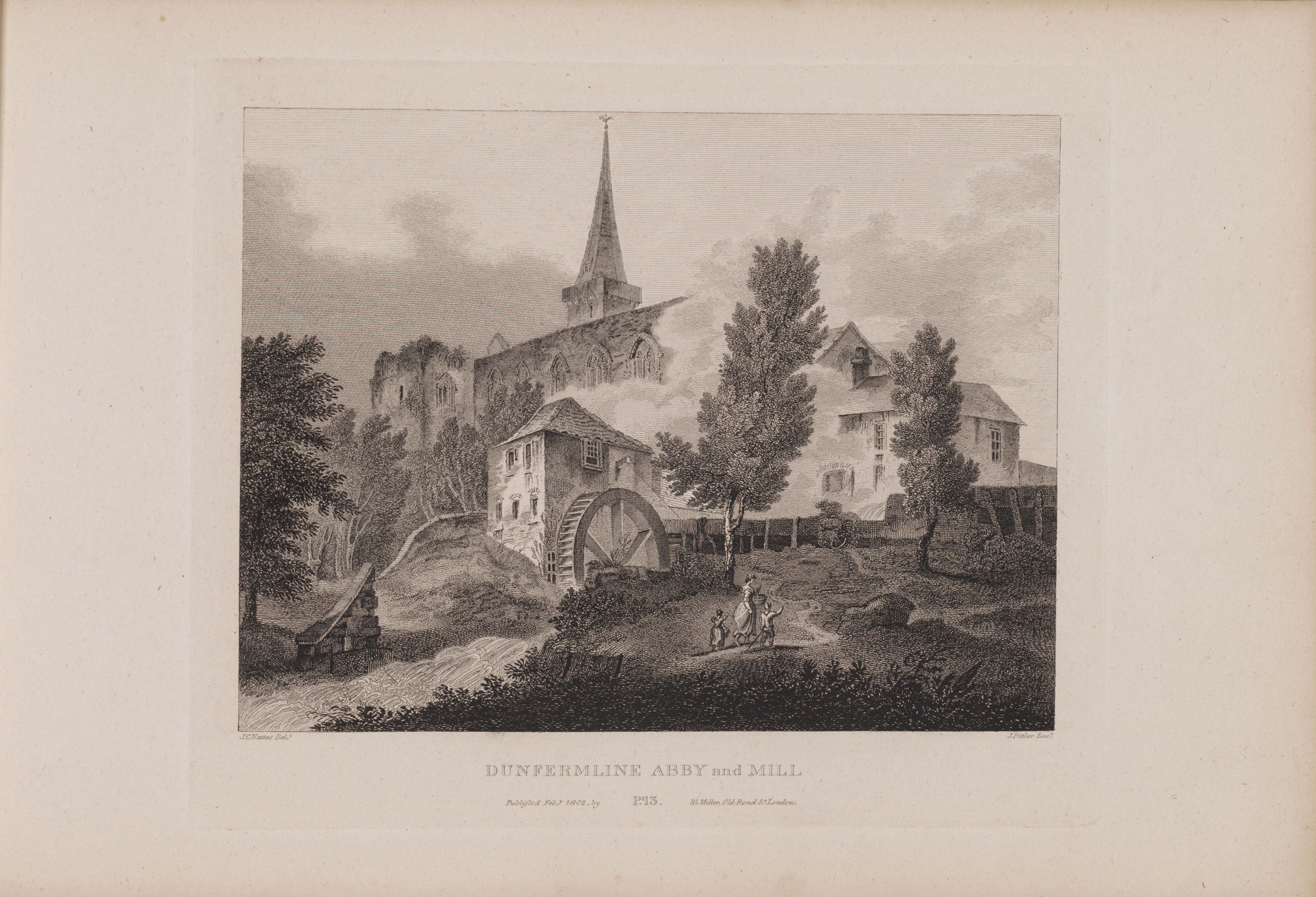
Engraving of Dunfermline Abbey and Mill by James Fittler in Scotia Depicta

King David I of Scotland (reigned 1124–53) would later grant this church, dedicated to the Holy Trinity, to "unam mansuram in burgo meo de Dunfermlyn", which translates into "a house or dwelling place in my burgh of Dunfermline". The foundations of the church evolved into an Abbey in 1128, under the reign of their son, David I. Dunfermline Abbey would play a major role in the general romanisation of religion throughout the kingdom. At the peak of its power the abbey controlled four burghs, three courts of regality and a large portfolio of lands from Moray in the north down into Berwickshire. From the time of Alexander I (reign 1107–24), the Abbey would also become firmly established as a prosperous royal mausoleum of the Scottish Crown. A total of eighteen royals, including seven Kings, were buried here from Queen Margaret in 1093 to Robert Stewart, Duke of Albany in 1420. During the Wars of Scottish Independence, Robert The Bruce insisted as early as 1314 that he wanted to be buried in the royal mausoleum in Dunfermline. This was so he could maintain the legacy of previous Scottish kings interred here, referring to them as our ‘predecessors’. Robert The Bruce (reigned 1306–29) would ultimately become the last of the seven Scottish Kings to be given this honour in 1329, although his heart was taken to Melrose Abbey.

Dunfermline had become a burgh between 1124 and 1127, if not before this time. Dunfermline Palace was also connected to the abbey and the first known documentation of the Auld Alliance was signed there on 23 October 1295.

Although the second son of James VI of Scotland and Anne of Denmark, Prince Charles was born in Dunfermline Palace, Fife, on 19 November 1600, the Union of the Crowns ended the town's royal connections when James VI relocated the Scottish royal court to London in 1603. King Charles thus became the last monarch to be born in Scotland. The Reformation of 1560 had previously meant a loss of the Dunfermline's ecclesiastical importance. David Ferguson was the town's first reformed minister. On 25 May 1624, a fire engulfed around three-quarters of the medieval-renaissance burgh. Some of the surviving buildings of the fire were the palace, the abbey and the Abbot's House.

=== Recent history ===
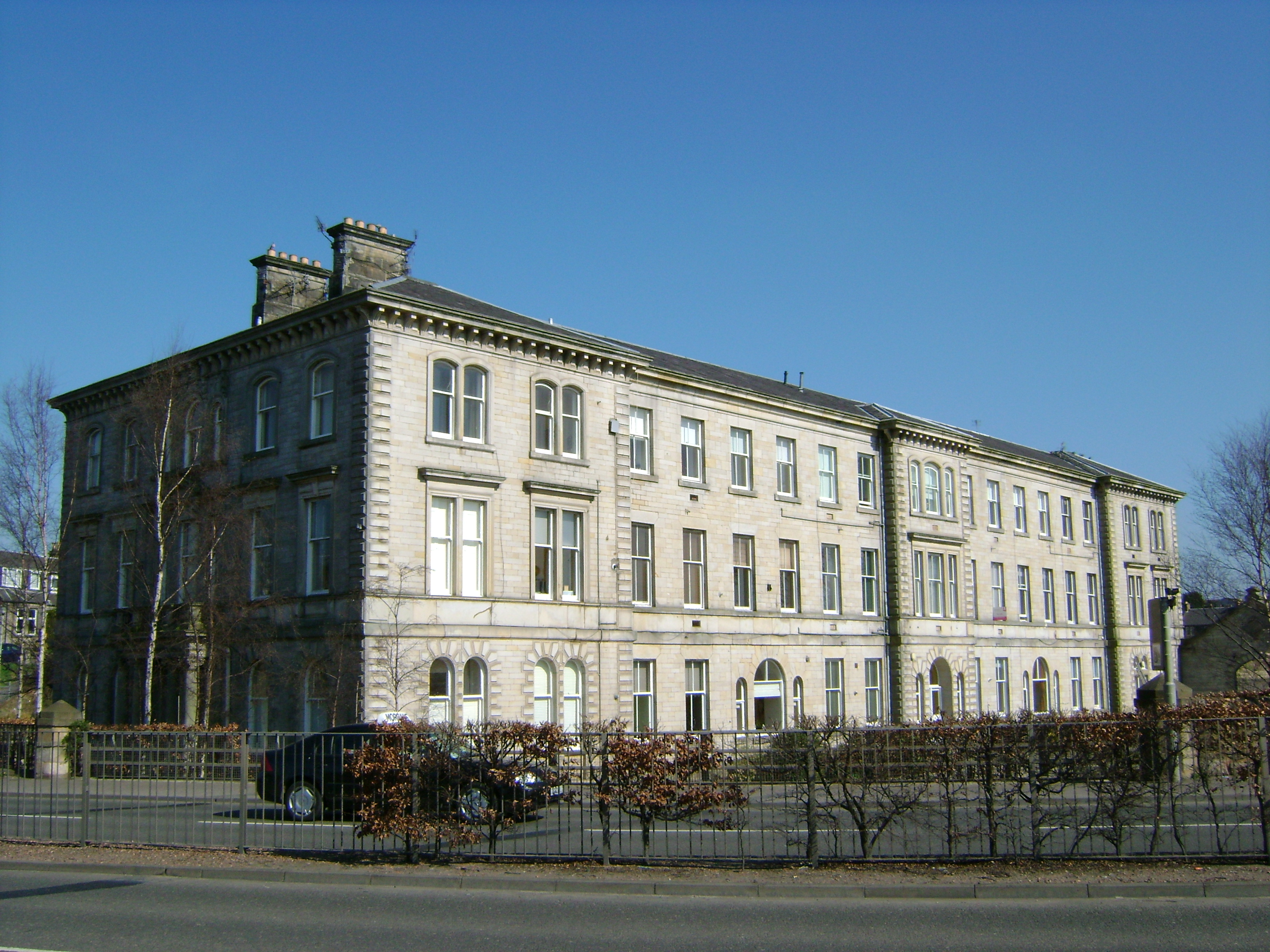
Erskine Beveridge company offices, now converted into flats

The decline in the fortunes of Dunfermline lasted until the introduction of a linen industry in the early 18th century. One reason for which the town became a centre for linen was there was enough water to power the mills and nearby ports along the Fife Coast. These ports also did trade with the Baltic and Low Countries. Another reason was through an act of industrial espionage in 1709 by a weaver known as James Blake who gained access to the workshops of a damask linen factory in Edinburgh by pretending to act like a simpleton in order to find out and memorise the formula. On his return to his home town in 1718, Blake established a damask linen industry in the town. The largest of these factories was St Leonard's Mill which was established by Erskine Beveridge in 1851. A warehouse and office block was later added around 1869. Other linen factories were built on land to both the north and south ends of the burgh. During the mid-19th century, power loom weaving started to replace linen damask. The latter did not survive, going into decline straight after the end of First World War. In 1909 the Royal Navy established Scotland's only Royal Naval Dockyard at nearby Rosyth. Post-war housing began in the late 1940s with the construction of temporary prefabs and Swedish timber houses around areas such as Kingseat and Townhill. Additional provisions were made for electricity, water and sewage systems. Council housing was focused towards Abbeyview, on a 97-hectare (240-acre) site on Aberdour Road; Touch, to the south of Garvock Hill; Bellyeoman and Baldridgeburn. Private housing became focused to the north of Garvock Hill and on the site of West Pitcorthie Farm.

Dunfermline has experienced significant expansion since 1999, especially in an expansion corridor on the eastern side of the town. This growth has edged the population centre towards the town's boundary with the M90 road corridor; it is planned to continue until 2022. Major developments include the creation of the Duloch and Masterton neighbourhoods with over 6,000 homes, three new primary schools, new community infrastructure, employment land and the Fife Leisure Park. With the expansion there has been a dramatic rise in the town's population; more than 20% over a 15-year period. Fife Council have begun drafting plans for an expansion of a similar scale on Dunfermline's south-west, west and north sides, which will see the creation of 4,000 homes, a new high school and three new primary schools in the first phase.

Today, Dunfermline is the main centre for the West Fife area, and is also considered to be a dormitory town for Edinburgh. The town has shopping facilities, a major public park, a main college campus at Halbeath and an-out-of-town leisure park with a multiplex cinema and a number of restaurants. The online retailer Amazon.com has opened a major distribution centre in the Duloch Park area of Dunfermline.

As part of the Platinum Jubilee Civic Honours, it was announced on 20 May 2022 that Dunfermline would be awarded city status. It was formally awarded the status through Letters Patent on 3 October 2022.

== Governance ==
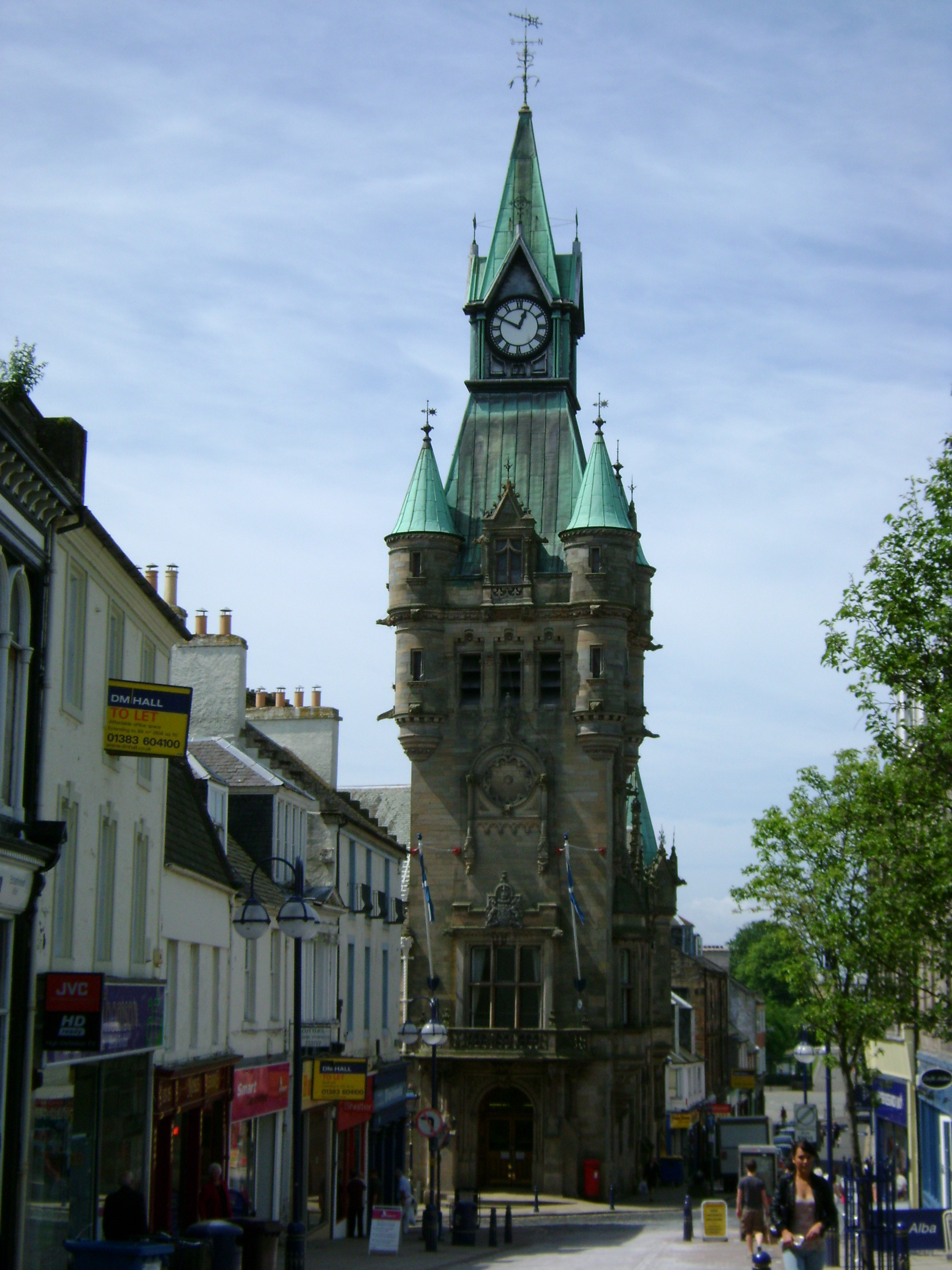
Dunfermline City Chambers

Dunfermline retained royal burgh status until this was abolished in 1975, under the Local Government (Scotland) Act 1973 in favour of a three-tier regions and districts. The royal burgh merged into Dunfermline District, which was one of three districts within the Fife region serving the town and West Fife from Kincardine to Aberdour. The district council was abolished in 1996, under the Local Government etc (Scotland) Act 1994, when the region became a unitary council area. The new unitary Fife Council adopted the areas of the former districts as council management areas, and created area committees to represent each.

Today, Dunfermline is represented by several tiers of elected government. Abbeyview, Bellyeoman, Carnock and Gowkhall, Central Dunfermline, Izatt Avenue & Nethertown and Touch and Garvock Community Councils form the lowest tier of governance, whose statutory role is to communicate local opinion to local and central government. Fife Council, the unitary local authority for Dunfermline, are the executive, deliberative and legislative body responsible for local governance. Dunfermline has retained some importance as an administrative centre with the council's principal west Fife office based at New City House. Councillor meetings, including the City of Dunfermline Area Committee, take place in the Dunfermline City Chambers.

Dunfermline forms part of the county constituency of Dunfermline and West Fife. The Dunfermline and West Fife UK (or Westminster) constituency, created in 2005 when the previous seats Dunfermline East and Dunfermline West were abolished, elects a Member of Parliament (MP) to the House of Commons of the Parliament of the United Kingdom by the first-past-the-post system. The seat is currently held by Douglas Chapman MP for the Scottish National Party. For the purposes of the Scottish Parliament, Dunfermline forms part of the Dunfermline constituency. The Dunfermline Scottish Parliament (or Holyrood) constituency created in 2011, following a review of Scottish Parliament constituency boundaries is one of nine within the Mid Scotland and Fife electoral region. Each constituency elects one Member of the Scottish Parliament (MSP) by the first-past-the-post system of election. The seat was won at 2016 Scottish Parliament elections by Shirley-Anne Somerville of the Scottish National Party.

Prior to Brexit in 2020, Dunfermline was part of the pan-Scotland European Parliament constituency which elected seven Members of the European Parliament (MEPs) using the d'Hondt method of party-list proportional representation.

== Geography ==
Dunfermline is at 56°04′17″N 3°27′42″W on the coastal fringe of Fife. The medieval town rose from approximately 51 metres (167 ft) above sea level in the south, where Nethertown Broad Street can now be found; 69 to 67 metres (226 to 220 ft) west to east along what is now Priory Lane; to 90 to 101 metres (295 to 331 ft) up the High Street, from west to east; to 92 to 105 metres (302 to 344 ft) between Bruce Street and Queen Anne Street from south to north.

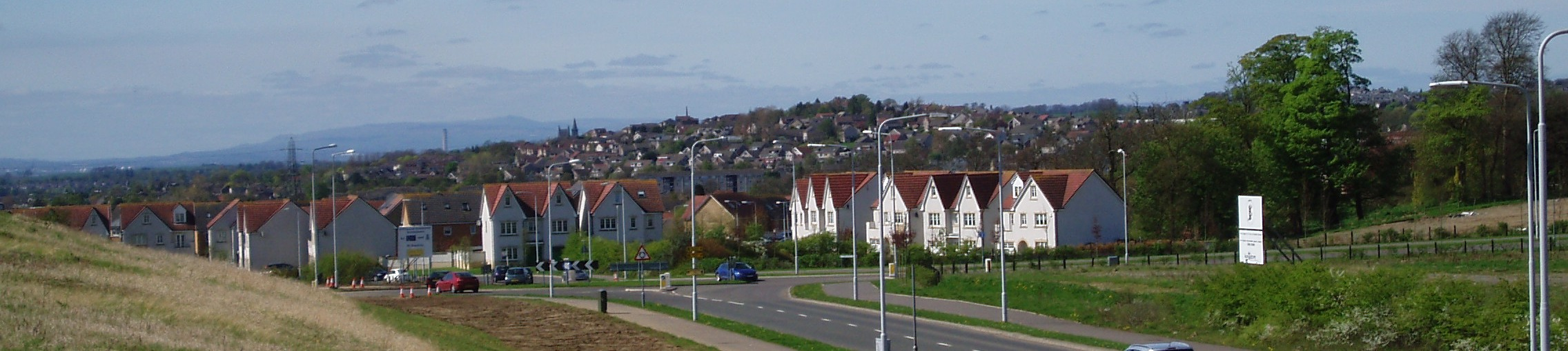
Panorama of Dunfermline seen from the town's Duloch neighbourhood in the east

Temperatures in Dunfermline, much like the rest of Scotland, are relatively moderate given its northern latitude. Fife is a peninsula, between the Firth of Tay to the north, Firth of Forth to the south and the North Sea to the east. Summers are relatively cool and the warming of the water over the summer, results in warm winters. Average annual temperatures in Dunfermline range from a maximum of 18 °C (64 °F) to a minimum of 9 °C (48 °F).

The town is geologically separated from the area to the north by the Cleish Hills.

== Demography ==
Dunfermline compared according to UK Census 2011
	Dunfermline	Fife	Scotland
Total population	49,706	365,198	5,295,403
Percentage Scottish identity only	62.1%	63.8%	62.4%
Over 75 years old	6.2%	7.9%	7.7%
Unemployed	5%	4%	4.8%

According to the 2001 census, Dunfermline had a total population of 39,229 representing 11.2% of Fife's total population. By the time of the 2011 Census, the population of Dunfermline had risen considerably to 49,706 and has again increased up to 50,380 in 2012. There are 21,620 households in Dunfermline, 70.7% of which were owned. The demographic make-up of the population is much in line with the rest of Scotland. The age group from 30 to 44 forms the largest portion of the population (23.7%). The total population in the Dunfermline area was estimated at 55,451 in 2016, with a projected increase of 29% expected by 2026. The number of households in the Dunfermline area in 2016 was recorded at 24,607; 77% of which were owner occupied, 18% social rented and 4% private rented. 30.6% of people live alone and 10.9% are in low income. The median weekly income is calculated at £363 for the area.

Recent Scottish Index of Multiple Deprivation (SIMD) figures indicate that the most deprived datazone in Dunfermline is Abbeyview North which is ranked as being one of the 5% most deprived areas in Scotland. The Headwell, Touch and Woodmill areas in Dunfermline fall within the 5–10% banding. Baldridgeburn, Brucefield and Halbeath areas are identified as being within the 10–15%, 15–20% banding of most deprived communities in Scotland.

At June 2017 there was a recorded 539 Jobseekers Allowance (JSA) claimants in the Dunfermline area representing a 1.4% rate which was lower than the Fife and Scottish averages.

== Economy ==
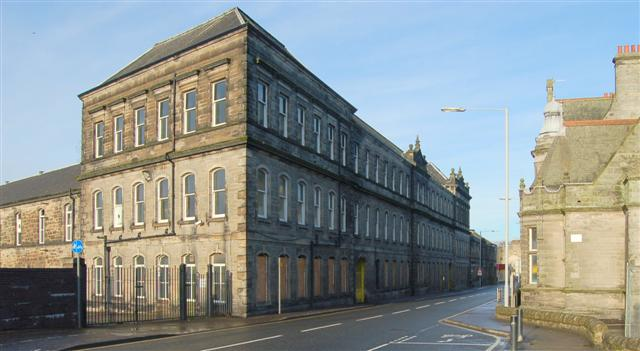
Former Pilmuir Works textile mill

Dunfermline Industry Employed compared according to UK Census 2011
	Dunfermline Area	Fife	Scotland
Area Committee Total Population (2011)	54,712	366,910	5,327,700
All Persons 16–74 in Employment (2011)	26,919	167,326	2,516,895
% Primary Industry Employment (2011)	1.1%	2.4%	3.3%
% Manufacturing Employment (2011)	8.3%	10.0%	7.7%
% Utilities Employment (2011)	1.5%	1.4%	1.6%
% Construction Employment (2011)	6.9%	8.2%	8.0%
% Wholesale, Retail & Transport Employed (2011)	17.8%	18.6%	19.9%
% Accommodation and Food Employed (2011)	5.0%	5.6%	6.3%
% ICT Employed (2011)	4.8%	3.0%	2.7%
% Finance & Professional Employed (2011)	25.5%	19.1%	20.1%
% Public sector Employed (2011)	7.4%	7.8%	7.0%
% Education & Health Employed (2011)	21.5%	23.8%	23.4%

From about the fifteenth century coal and limestone had been extracted in the area around Dunfermline, at first on a very small and localised scale. As the Agricultural Revolution gathered pace the demand for lime (for improving land) increased the requirement for coal to burn it. Salt panning too required coal in large quantities, and the early outcrops near the Firth of Forth became exhausted, forcing the extraction to take place further inland. Many of the sites were within the present-day limits of Dunfermline.

The increasing distance of the pits from the Forth made transport of the minerals an issue, and Dunfermline was a pioneer in the construction of wooden waggonways for the purpose. By the eighteenth century a complex network had developed, and in time many of the lines were converted to railways: the Halbeath Railway, the Fordell Railway, the Elgin Railway and the Townhill Tramway being the most prominent. They generally ran from north to south, still conveying the mineral to the harbours at Charlestown, Limekilns, Inverkeithing and St David's. From 1848 more modern railways entered Dunfermline, at first on a west to east axis, intersecting the mineral lines. In time the latter were converted to make through running on to the main line network possible.

During the Industrial Revolution and victorian period industry in Dunfermline was concentrated to the north of the town centre around Pilmuir Street and to the south along sections of the Lynn Burn at Elgin and Bothwell Streets with textiles being particularly important to the town's economy. After the end of the Second World War traditional industries, particularly linen and coal mining, declined and eventually became obsolete in the town with many factories ceasing production. Manufacturing in the town rejuvenated by the early 1960s when Monotype Corporation opened a new factory on Halbeath Road. The completion of the Pitreavie Industrial Estate (now known as the Pitreavie Business Park) opened in the mid-1970s, following the arrival of Philips and the re-location of the offices of the Dunfermline Press. Smaller industrial estates were focused on Elgin Street, Halbeath Drive and Primrose Lane.

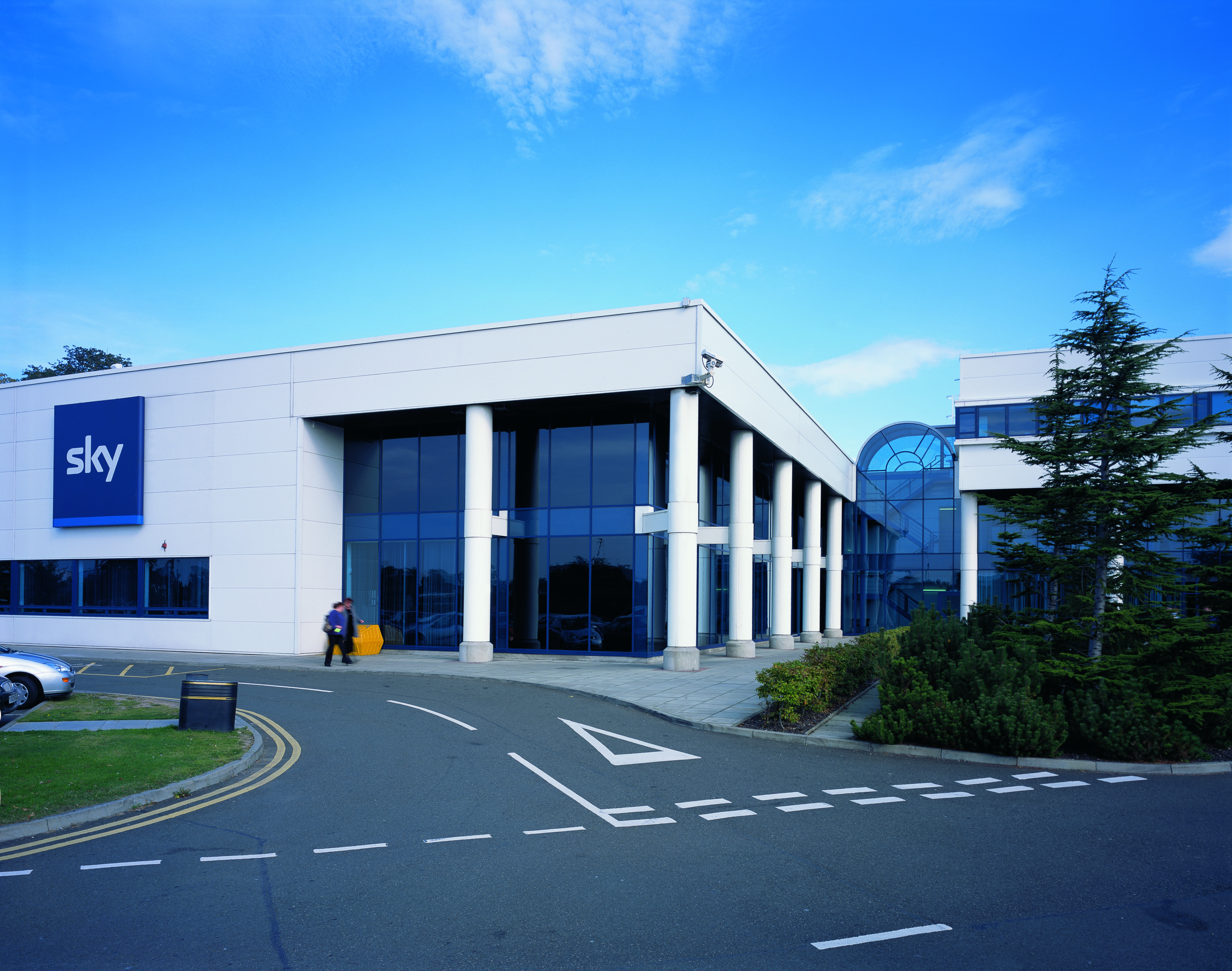
Sky Office and Contact Centre

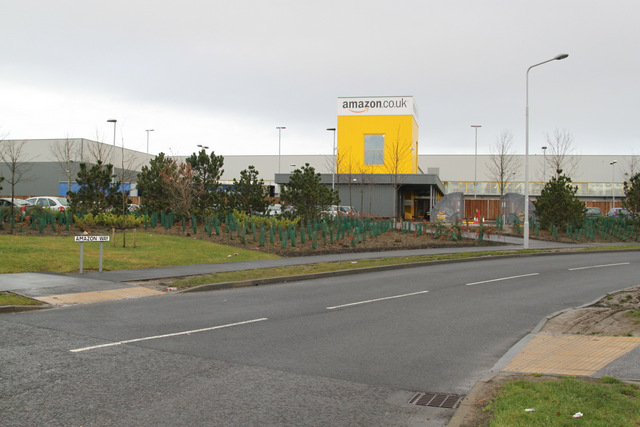
Amazon EDI4 Fulfillment Center

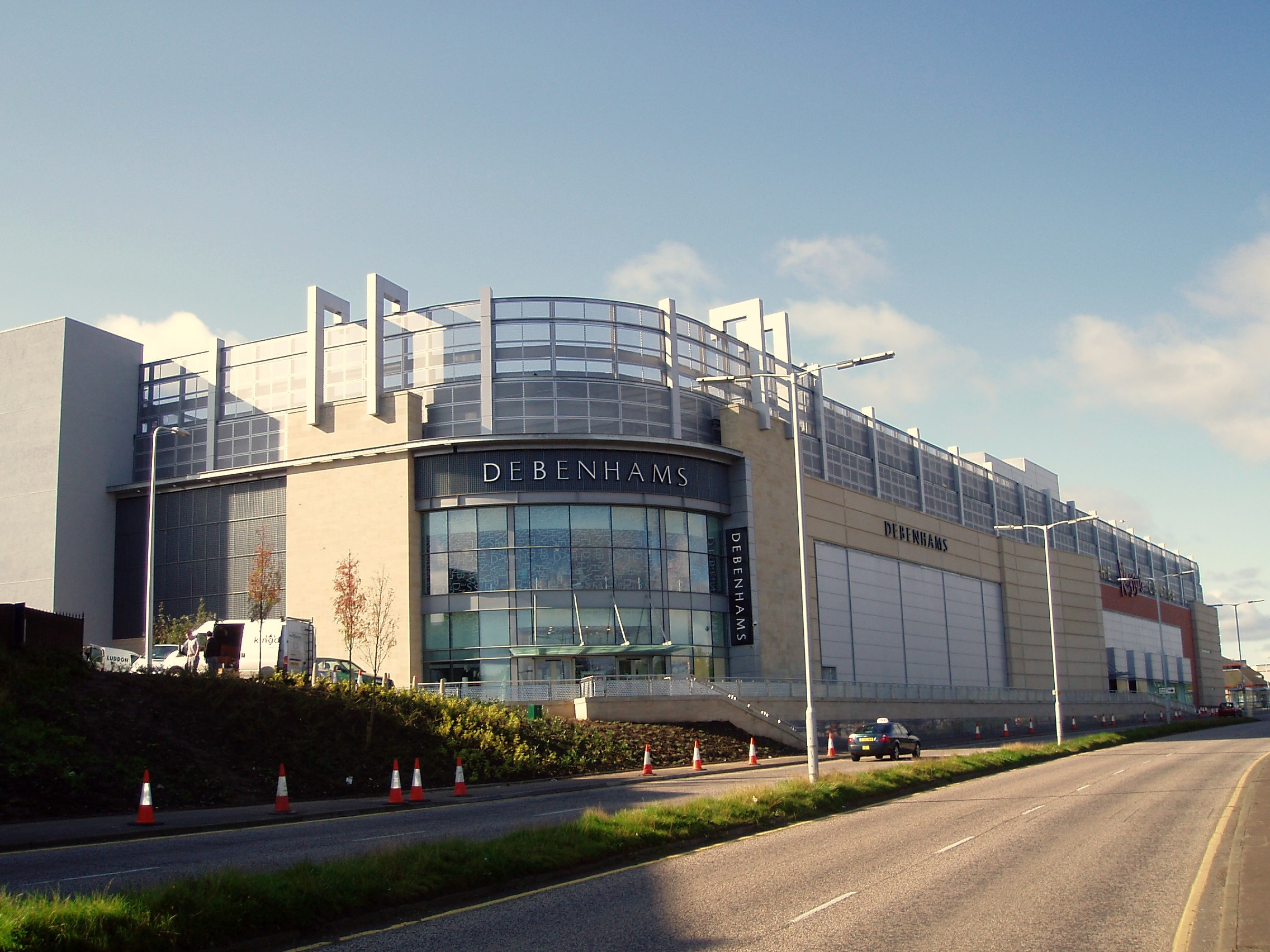
Kingsgate Shopping Centre

The Dunfermline area has Fife's largest concentration of employment providing approximately 26,600 jobs in 2009; approximately 16% of the 163,000 jobs in Fife. Wholesale and Retail (over 18% of local jobs) Health and Social Work (over 15% of local jobs) and Information and Communication (over 10% of local jobs) are the predominant sectors in the local economy. There are also moderate instances of employment in finance, manufacturing, food services and accommodation.

Key local employers include Best Western (hotels), Sky UK (home entertainment and communications), CR Smith (windows manufacturing), TechnipFMC (offshore energy), Lloyds and Nationwide (both financial services). In November 2011 online retailer Amazon.com opened a 93,000 m^{2} (1,000,000 sq ft) fulfilment warehouse in the east of the town adjacent to the M90 motorway. This development has created over 750 jobs and is the company's largest warehouse in the UK. The Newcastle based, Shepherd Offshore Group also plan to erect a renewables hub near the Halbeath Interchange, off the M90 on a 6-hectare (15-acre) former Hyundai/Motorola 'white elephant' factory. The demolition of the factory began in early 2011 with an expected date for completion at the end of the year. A masterplan is being created for the site identifying significant investment and development opportunities with the potential to create a substantial number of new jobs.

Dunfermline is the principal shopping centre serving the western area of Fife and is the region's second largest town centre by floorspace. Retailing accounts for 18% of the total number of jobs in the town. A BID (Business Improvement District) scheme for the town centre has been in operation since 2009. The majority of shops and retail services in Dunfermline are concentrated in the town centre along a high street. The Kingsgate Shopping Centre is located on the pedestrianised section of the High Street giving Dunfermline a mix of modern and traditional shops. A major extension of the Kingsgate Shopping Centre was completed in 2008 improving and expanding the retail offer in the town by attracting a major department store brand and range of other smaller retailers. Other retail areas in Dunfermline exist at Carnegie Drive Retail Park to the north of the town centre and Halbeath Retail Park to the east of the town. A large neighbourhood centre with one of the towns major supermarkets was also built as part of the eastern expansion area of Dunfermline. The Fife Leisure Park, constructed in 1999 is adjacent to the M90 at Halbeath on the eastern outskirts of Dunfermline. The leisure park has a large cinema, a health club, bowling alley and a number of restaurants.

== Landmarks and notable buildings ==
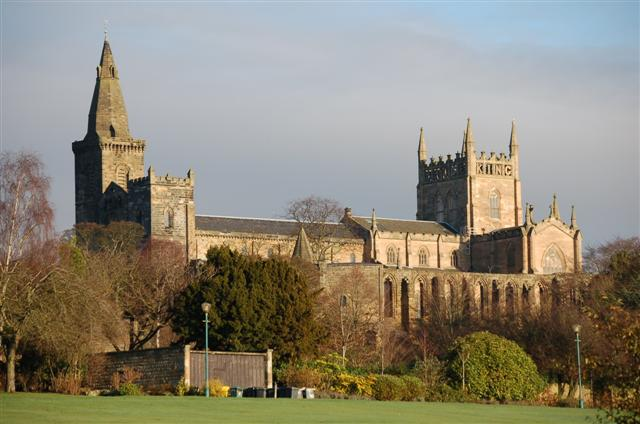
Dunfermline Palace and Abbey

The Category A listed Dunfermline Abbey on the Kirkgate is one of the best examples of Scoto-Norman monastic architecture. The Abbey, built between 1128 and 1150 under David I, was a reconstruction of the Benedictine chapel dedicated to the Holy Trinity, founded by his mother, Queen Margaret. Despite much of the monastic buildings being destroyed by the troops of Edward I in 1303, there are substantial remains, with the lower stories of the dormitory and latrine blocks on the east side of the cloister being the earliest surviving parts, dating back to the early 13th century. The Abbey parish church, designed by the architect William Burn, was built between 1818 and 1821 on the site of the medieval choir and transepts which had been the eastern part of the abbey.

The main Dunfermline War Memorial on Monastery Street was unveiled by the Lord Lieutenant of Fife, Sir Ralph Anstruther, in 1925. A Second World War Memorial and garden of remembrance were added in 1958 on a site assumed to have been home to the Apiaries of the Monastery. The memorial lists 632 of those killed in the First World War and another 275 in the Second World War.

To the north of the abbey, on the corner of Maygate and Abbot Street, is the Category A listed Abbot House. This is the oldest secular building still standing in Dunfermline. The house was originally built in the mid-fifteenth century as a residence for Abbot Richard Bothwell and this role continued until Commendator George Durie left to move into new apartments at the Palace in 1540. Along Abbot Street is the Category B listed Dunfermline Carnegie Library which was built between 1881 and 1883. This library was the first in the world to be funded via donations by steel magnate and philanthropist Andrew Carnegie. A total of 2,811 free public libraries were eventually built altogether. At the top of Moodie Street is the Category B listed handloom weavers' cottage, the birthplace of Andrew Carnegie, which dates from the early 18th century. An adjacent memorial hall was added to the birthplace in 1928. Just off East Port between Carnegie Hall and the High Street is Viewfield House, a large square stone Palladian three storey villa, built in about 1808 for James Blackwood, Provost of Dunfermline, and now a listed building. It served as home to the Carnegie Trust's Craft School from 1920 to 1940.

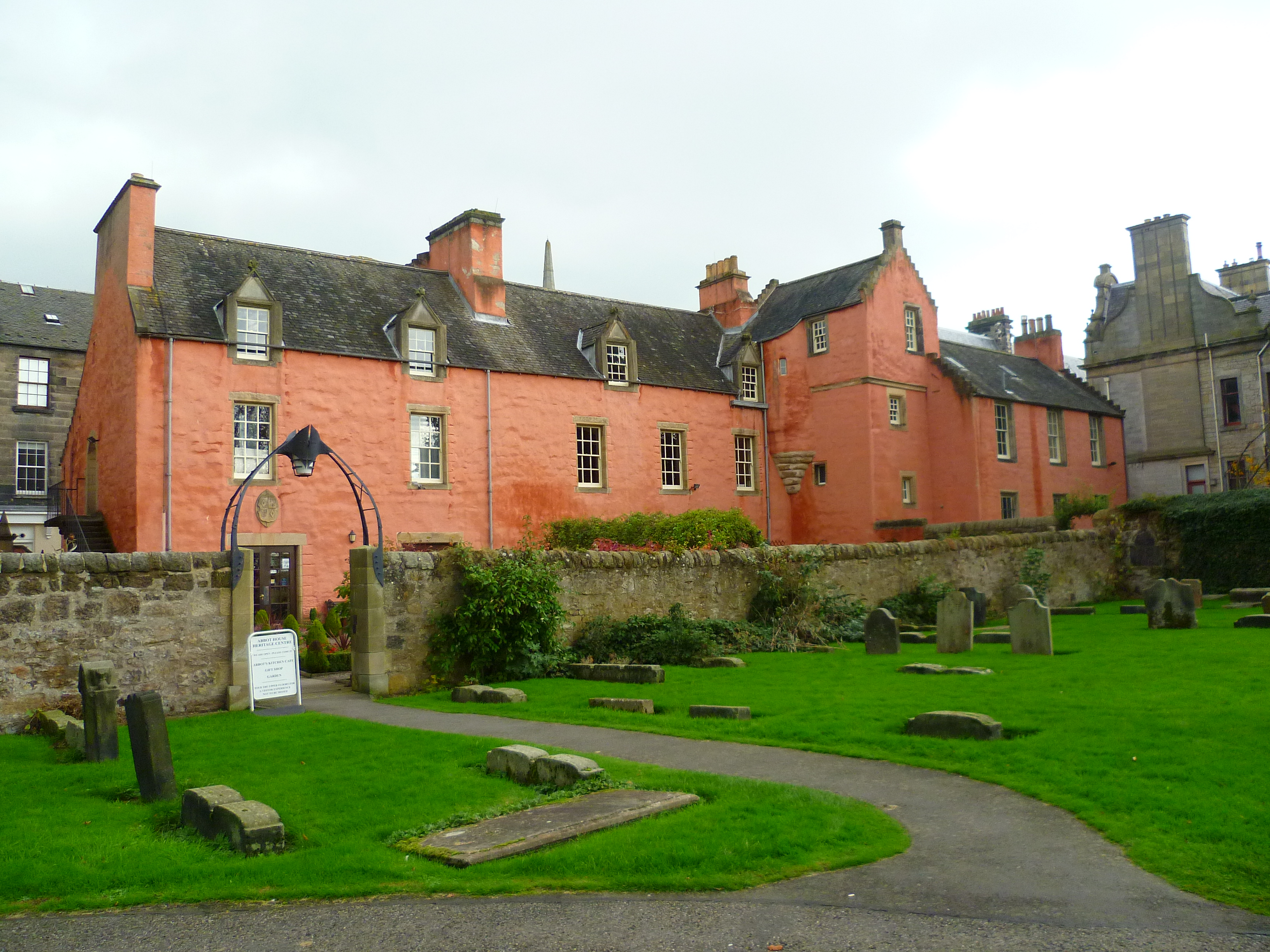
Abbot House (rear view)

The Category A listed Dunfermline Guildhall on the High Street was erected in 1807 by the guilds of the local merchants who were ambitious for Dunfermline to become the county town of Fife. Lack of funds forced the building to be sold, but in 1811 funds were available to add the 40-metre-high (130 ft) steeple. At the west end of the High Street is the Category A listed City Chambers with its 36-metre-high (118 ft) high central clock tower and turrets, designed by James Campbell Walker and built between 1876 and 1879 .

In the car park between Bruce Street and Chambers Street is St Margaret's Cave, a place where she would retreat to pray in peace and quiet. The cave was re-opened in 1993 to celebrate the 900th anniversary of her death. Forming the main entrance to Pittencrieff Park at the junction of Bridge Street and Chalmers Street are the Category A listed Louise Carnegie Memorial Gates, otherwise known as the Glen Gates. The gates, which opened in 1929, were paid for by the Dunfermline Carnegie Trust and named after Louise Carnegie, the wife of Andrew Carnegie. They lead up a path to a bronze statue of Andrew Carnegie which was unveiled in 1914.

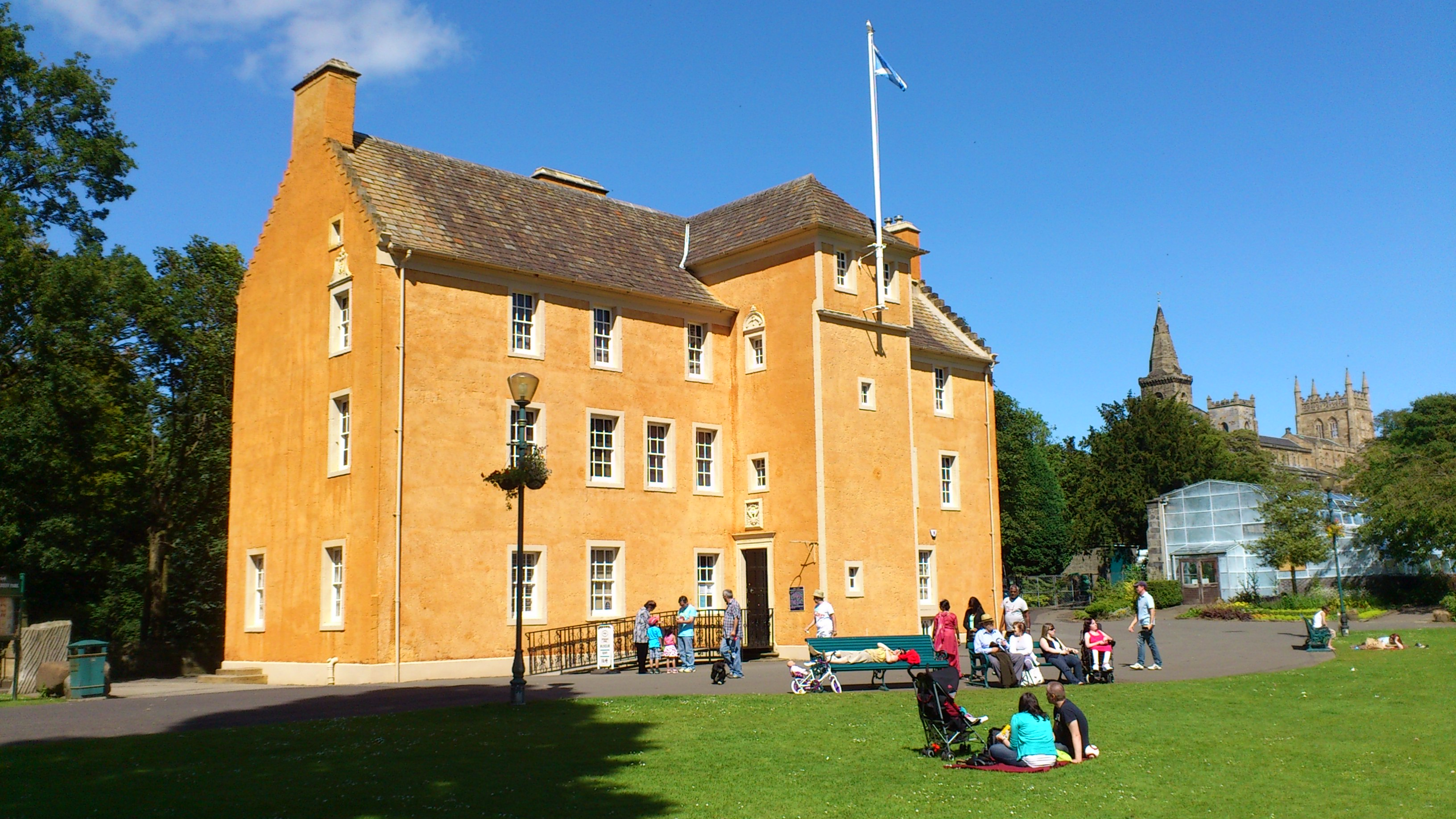
Pittencrieff House Museum

In the subsequent development of the modern park, the Category A listed Pittencrieff House, built around 1610 for Sir William Clerk of Penicuik, was designed as a centre piece. Two of the bedrooms were converted to create two long galleries for museum and art exhibition space in a restoration programme undertaken by Sir Robert Lorimer between 1911 and 1913. Work on the building was completed in 2010 to repair and reharl the property, restoring the original ochre-coloured limewash exterior. The project was funded through the £1.7 million Dunfermline Conservation Area Regeneration Scheme (CARS) under a partnership between Fife Council and Historic Scotland.

A number of stately homes also exist on the outskirts of the town. The Category A listed Pitfirrane Castle, to the west of Dunfermline, was once the seat of the Halkett family. The castle, which dates from the 16th century, was purchased by the Carnegie Dunfermline Trust in 1951 for the use as a clubhouse for Dunfermline Golf Club. To the south of Dunfermline is the Category A listed Hill House and Pitreavie Castle. Both dating from the mid-17th century, Hill House was built as a residence for William Monteith of Randford and Pitreavie Castle as a manor house by Sir Hendry Wardlaw. To the south-west of Dunfermline is the Category A listed Logie House, built as an Edwardian residence and seat for the Hunt family.

Further Carnegie funded buildings include the Carnegie Leisure Centre, designed by Hippolyte Blanc in 1905, and the Carnegie Clinic by H & D Barclay from 1909 to 1912.

== Culture ==
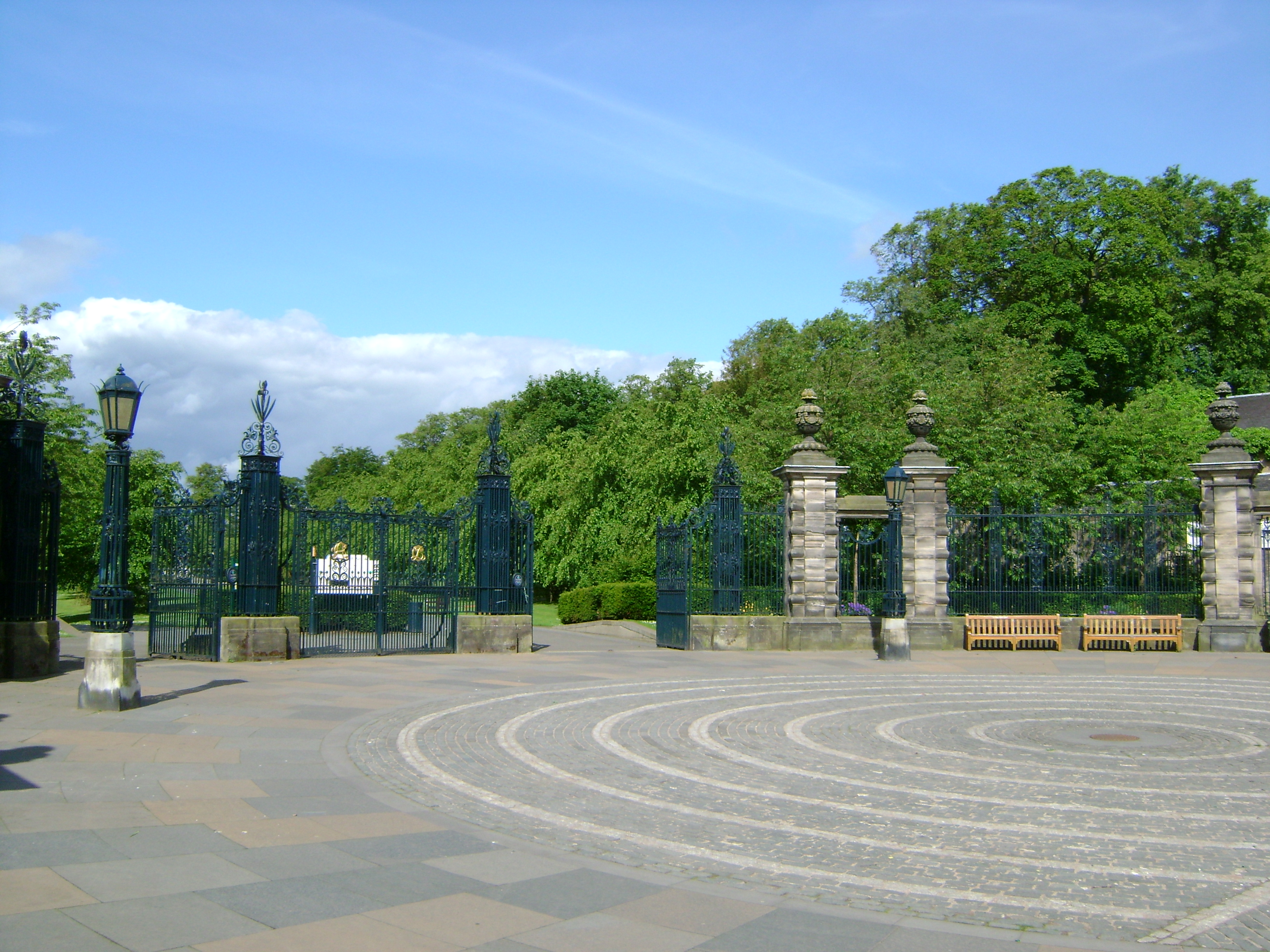
Louise Carnegie Memorial Gates, leading into Pittencrieff Park

Pittencrieff Park forms the western boundary of the town centre covering 31 hectares (76 acres). It was given to the people of Dunfermline in 1903 by Andrew Carnegie. The park is known locally as the Glen and was created from the estate of Pittencrieff and the lands of the house, owned by the Lairds of Pittencrieff. A £1.4 million project to regenerate, restore and re-establish the park began in 2009 and is ongoing. In December 2011 Pittencrieff Park was awarded £710,000 through the Heritage Lottery Fund's Parks for People programme for essential maintenance work. A previous award of £27,000 was made under this scheme in 2010. The work included the restoration of historic buildings and bridges; new lighting and the refurbishment of the greenhouse to create a classroom. A separate £1 million project finished in 2012, extending the Glen Pavilion to provide a new 120 seat cafe and linking corridor to the rear of the building.

The Bruce Festival is an annual attraction held in Pittencrieff Park every August. The festival which promotes Robert The Bruce's links to Dunfermline centres on a medieval village and is home to a food fayre, battle reenactments and displays of arts and crafts.

The Andrew Carnegie birthplace museum at the corner of Moodie Street and Priory Lane is dedicated to the well-known businessman and philanthropist. The museum is made up of two buildings; the weaver's cottage, his birthplace and the memorial hall which tells his life story. Annual heritage walks organised by the museum take place each summer. The Abbot House on Maygate is the oldest building in the town.

In 2017, Dunfermline Carnegie Library & Galleries opened, an extension of the former Carnegie library building. This provides the town with museum, art gallery, archive, library, cafe and garden spaces. Funders included Fife Council (£6.8 million) and the Heritage Lottery Fund (£2.8 million). The building has won architectural awards: EAA Building of the Year and Royal Incorporation of Architects in Scotland's (RIAS) Andrew Doolan prize.

Dunfermline has two theatres, Carnegie Hall on East Port and the Alhambra on Canmore Street. Carnegie Hall hosts a range of theatrical and musical productions including an annual Christmas show. The Music Institute, adjacent to the Hall also provides workshops, classes and children's groups. The Alhambra, which opened in 1922, originally served as a dual-purpose role hosting both theatrical productions and films. In 2008, the theatre re-opened as a theatre and live music venue. Since 1938, Dunfermline has also been home to the 'Kinema Ballroom' a ballroom/dancehall which has evolved into a famous live music performance venue and nightclub which has hosted many internationally acclaimed artists. Local groups include the Dunfermline Folk Club, Dunfermline Abbey Choir and Dunfermline district pipe band. The venue is now a world buffet restaurant.

Dunfermline Fire Station, a category B listed building, is an arts venue, cafe and studio space.

== Media ==
Television signals are received from either the Craigkelly or Black Hill TV transmitters.

Radio West Fife is one of the oldest hospital radio stations in Scotland which broadcasts by landline to the Queen Margaret Hospital in the city.

The town is also served by nation-wide radio stations, BBC Radio Scotland, Forth 1, Kingdom FM and Greatest Hits Radio Scotland.

The Dunfermline Press is the town's weekly local newspaper.

The official guide to Dunfermline looked after by the Local Tourism Association is Dunfermline.com

== Sports ==
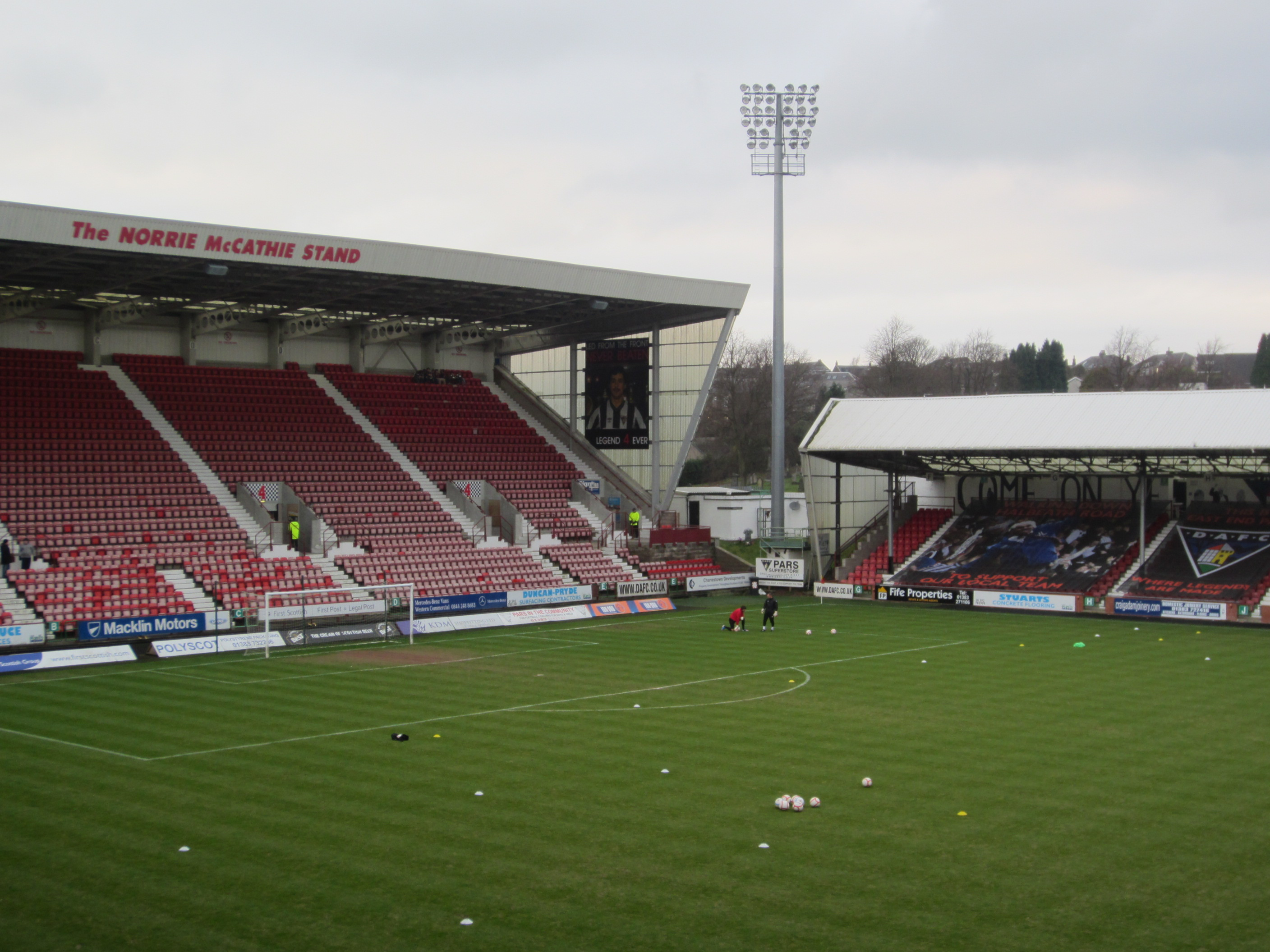
East End Park, the home stadium of Dunfermline Athletic F.C.

Dunfermline is home to a professional football team, as well as rugby and cricket teams. The senior football team, Dunfermline Athletic play their games at East End Park in the Scottish Championship. The team have become famous for winning the Scottish Cup twice in the 1960s (1961 and 1968) gaining a reputation as a side for competitive football in both England and mainland Europe. The senior rugby team, Dunfermline RFC play their games at McKane Park in Caledonia League Division 1. Dunfermline Reign are a basketball team that competes in the Scottish Men's National League Division 1. The team reached the playoffs for the first time in 2017. Dunfermline Tennis Club plays at Bothwell Street, competing in East of Scotland and national competitions. The club's ladies team has won the Scottish Cup a record 18 times since 1988.

There is also a cricket club based at Carnegie Cricket Ground, an athletics ground at Pitreavie and three golf courses (Dunfermline, Canmore and Pitreavie). Carnegie Leisure Centre (originally Carnegie swimming baths) is the main sports centre. A £17.2 million major refurbishment and extension to the centre was completed in November 2011. The work has included the conversion of a 25-yard (23 m) Edwardian training pool into a modern 25-metre 6-lane deck-level pool with movable floor; an improved entrance and reception area with a new cafe and a new state-of-the-art gym with 80 stations.

The Dunfermline Kings are the town's American football team, playing their games at Duloch Park.

The town's competitive running clubs include Dunfermline Track and Field Club, Pitreavie AAC and PH Racing Club. There are also a number of local jogging groups.

Dunfermline Cycling Club located in the towns Pittencrieff Park was formed in 1935 and is now one of the largest cycling clubs in Scotland. It has members who take part in competition and recreational events.

== Education ==
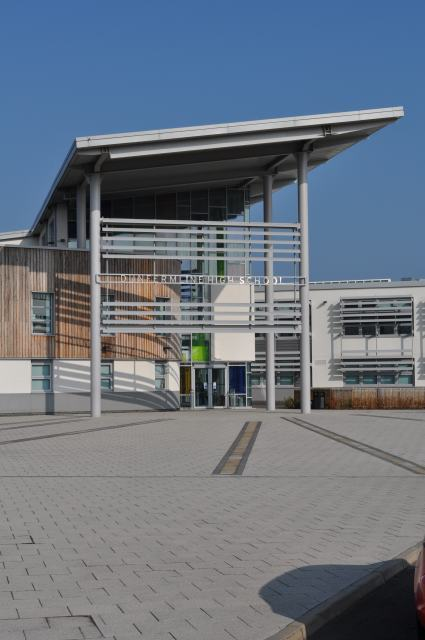
Dunfermline High School, established in 1468, is one of the oldest schools in the world

Dunfermline has four secondary schools and fourteen primary schools. Other educational facilities include a private school and Calaiswood ASN School for children with learning difficulties and complex health needs. Dunfermline High School is the oldest secondary in the town, having originated in 1816 on what is now Queen Anne Street. The school which serves both the southern and western parts of the town as well as Rosyth and Kincardine has occupied a site on St Leonard's Street since 1939. A new £40 million Dunfermline High School opened in August 2012. The old school was demolished, allowing new playing fields for the school in 2013. Queen Anne High School is located in Wellwood towards the northwest area of the town. Woodmill High School, originally a junior secondary, was upgraded to a High School in 1972. The school was first established in Priory Lane before moving to a new building on Shields Road in 1960 and serves the eastern side of the town as well as the villages of Crombie, Limekilns and North Queensferry. St Columba's High, which opened in 1969 is one of two Roman Catholic secondary schools in Fife. The school caters for pupils living in West Fife from Kincardine in the west to Cowdenbeath in the east. The SSERC Campus (formerly the Scottish Schools Education Research Centre) is based in Dunfermline and operates nationally to support schools and teachers delivering STEM subjects.

Further education is provided by Fife College. It was founded as Lauder Technical School in 1899 and funded by Andrew Carnegie who named it after his uncle, George Lauder who had been a campaigner for free technical education. A textile school, founded in 1910 and also funded by Carnegie later merged with the technical school in 1927. The school became known as a technical college in 1951 and the name was then shortened to Lauder College in the late 20th century before becoming Carnegie College in 2007. In 2013 Carnegie became part of Fife College. It is a partner of the Dunfermline Business Centre and provides courses catering to over 10,000 students annually.

== Public services ==
Waste management is handled by the local authority, Fife Council. There is a kerbside recycling scheme in operation in the town. A four-bin collection is in place for the majority of residents living within Fife. Dunfermline has one recycling centre and several recycling points, all operated by the local authority, Fife Council. Non-hazardous waste is sent to landfill at Lochhead, near the town and Lower Melville Wood, near Ladybank.

Healthcare is supplied by NHS Fife who have their headquarters at Hayfield House in Kirkcaldy. The main acute in-patient and accident & emergency services are provided by the Victoria Hospital, Kirkcaldy, 13 miles (21 km) to the east. The Queen Margaret Hospital provides some long-stay beds but is primarily for out-patient and day care services with a minor injuries unit.

Statutory emergency fire and rescue service in the town is provided by the Scottish Fire and Rescue Service. The nearest station is at the Pitreavie Industrial Estate. Policing in Dunfermline is provided by Police Scotland. The headquarters of the Dunfermline area is on 2 Holyrood Place, close to the town centre. Dunfermline is also served under the East Central Region which covers Tayside, Forth Valley and the Kingdom of Fife of the Scottish Ambulance Service. There are two ambulance stations in the town; one on Keir Hardie Terrace and the other at the Queen Margaret Hospital on Whitefield Road.

== Provosts of Dunfermline ==
The role of Provost was abolished in 1996 following the abolition of Dunfermline District Council and its subsequent adoption into Fife Council.

List of Provosts of Dunfermline
- Alexander Thane (1424–1424)
- John Couper (1464–1465)
- David Couper (1488–1488)
- William Stewart (1489–1490)
- David Couper (1490–1491)
- John Menteith (1491–1493)
- David Couper (1494–1498)
- William Simpson (1498–1500)
- David Couper (1500–1505)
- Henry Bothwell (1505–1511)
- Henry Halkett (1511–1512)
- Robert Stewart (1516–1517)
- John Halkett (1517–1532)
- Patrick Halkett (1549–1552)
- George Halkett (1585–1585)
- Sir Robert Halkett (1606–1608)
- James Reid (1610–1611)
- Thomas Wardlaw (1611–1621)
- James Reid (1622–1625)
- Thomas Wardlaw (1625–1628)
- James Gib (1629–1629)
- Sir Robert Halkett (1630–1634)
- James Reid (1638–1639)
- Peter Law (1639–1640)
- Alexander Clerk (1640–1641)
- James Reid (1641–1645)
- Peter Law (1646–1646)
- James Reid (1647–1647)
- Peter Law (1648–1648)
- William Walker (1649–1650)
- James Reid (1653–1654)
- William Walker (1655–1655)
- Peter Walker (1655–1656)
- James Reid (1656–1656)
- William Walker (1657–1658)
- Peter Walker (1660–1660)
- David Forman (1662–1662)
- William Walker (1665–1665)
- Peter Walker (1668–1668)
- William Walker (1673–1673)
- Charles Wardlaw (1673–1673)
- Peter Walker (1674–1675)
- Charles Wardlaw (1675–1675)
- William Walker (1677–1677)
- Sir Charles Halkett (1678–1681)
- George Durie (1687–1687)
- Sir Charles Halkett (1693–1696)
- Sir Patrick Murray (1697–1699)
- Sir James Halkett (1700–1704)
- Sir Peter Halkett (1705–1731)
- Marquis of Tweeddale (1734–1739)
- Lord Charles Hay (1739–1752)
- Sir Peter Halkett (1752–1755)
- Alexander Wedderburn (1755–1757)
- Francis Halkett (1758–1759)
- David Turnbull (1760–1765)
- John Wilson Jr. (1765–1774)
- David Turnbull (1778–1783)
- John Wilson (1783–1787)
- Adam Low of Fordell (1787–1789)
- John Wilson Jr. (1789–1791)
- James Moodie (1792–1797)
- John Wilson Jr. (1797–1807)
- James Moodie (1800 – 18??)
- David Wilson (1808–1822)
- John Scotland (1822–1824)
- George Meldrum (1830–1831)
- John Kerr (1831–1832)
- Henry Russell (1832–1836)
- James Smith Ronaldson (1843–1849)
- James Walls (1877–1883)
- Robert Donald (1883–1890)
- James Walls (1891–1894)
- Thomas Stewart (1915–1915)
- Sir James Norval (1918–1924)
- Robert Wilson (1927–1930)
- David J. McKay (1933–1936)
- James Hoggan (1936–1942)
- Donald Thomson Kennedy (1942–1945)
- George Izatt (1945–1948)
- John Stewart Gellatly (1948–1952)
- Robert Hay Robertson (1952–1955)
- John Allan (1955–1958)
- Archibald Frederick (1958–1961)
- Jean H. Mackie (1961–1964)
- John S. Anderson (1967–1967)
- Robert W. Mill (1984–1988)
- James Cameron (1988–1992)

== Transport ==
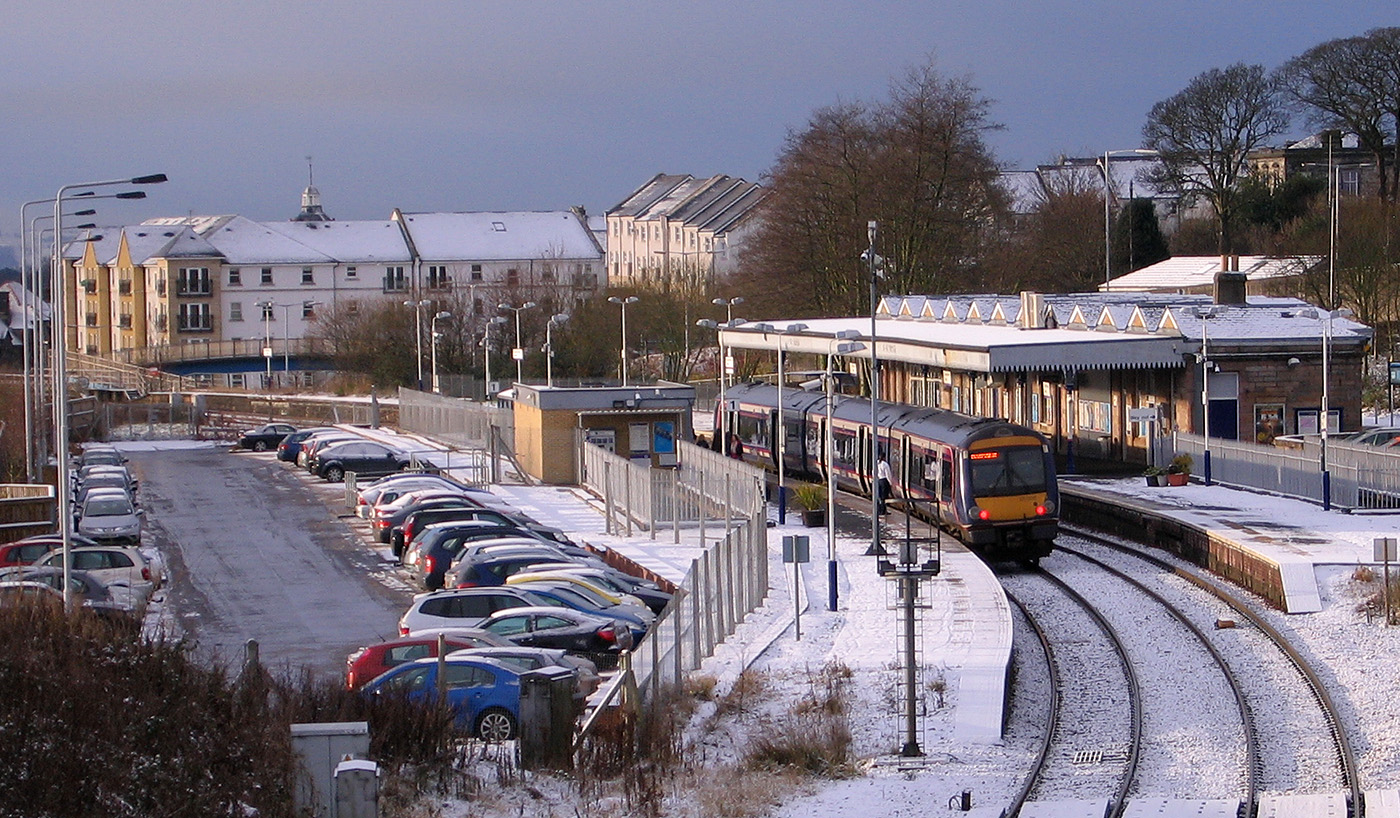
Dunfermline City railway station

Dunfermline is served by the A907 which meets the M90 and A92 to the east of the city at Halbeath Interchange. This connects the city to Perth to the north, Edinburgh to the south and Kirkcaldy to the east. The main routes through the city are Halbeath Road and Carnegie Drive (A907) from east to west.

The main bus terminus Dunfermline bus station is located to the north of the city centre which provides seating, toilets and a convenience store. In addition to this, there are also two Park and Ride schemes nearby at Ferrytoll, to the south of Inverkeithing, and Halbeath. There are plans to create a "park and choose" site at Rosyth. There was formerly a second bus station, called St. Margarets. It is now a car park.

Two railway stations serve the city – Dunfermline City to the south of the city centre and Dunfermline Queen Margaret to the east of the city close to Queen Margaret Hospital, with a third proposed to serve Halbeath Park and Ride. Nearby stations also exist at Rosyth, Inverkeithing and Dalgety Bay to the south of the town.

The nearest major international airport to Dunfermline is Edinburgh Airport, 13 miles (21 km) south of Dunfermline. Smaller municipal airports are also located nearby at Glenrothes (18 miles [29 km]), Cumbernauld (25 miles [40 km]) and Perth (26 miles [42 km]).

== Notable people ==
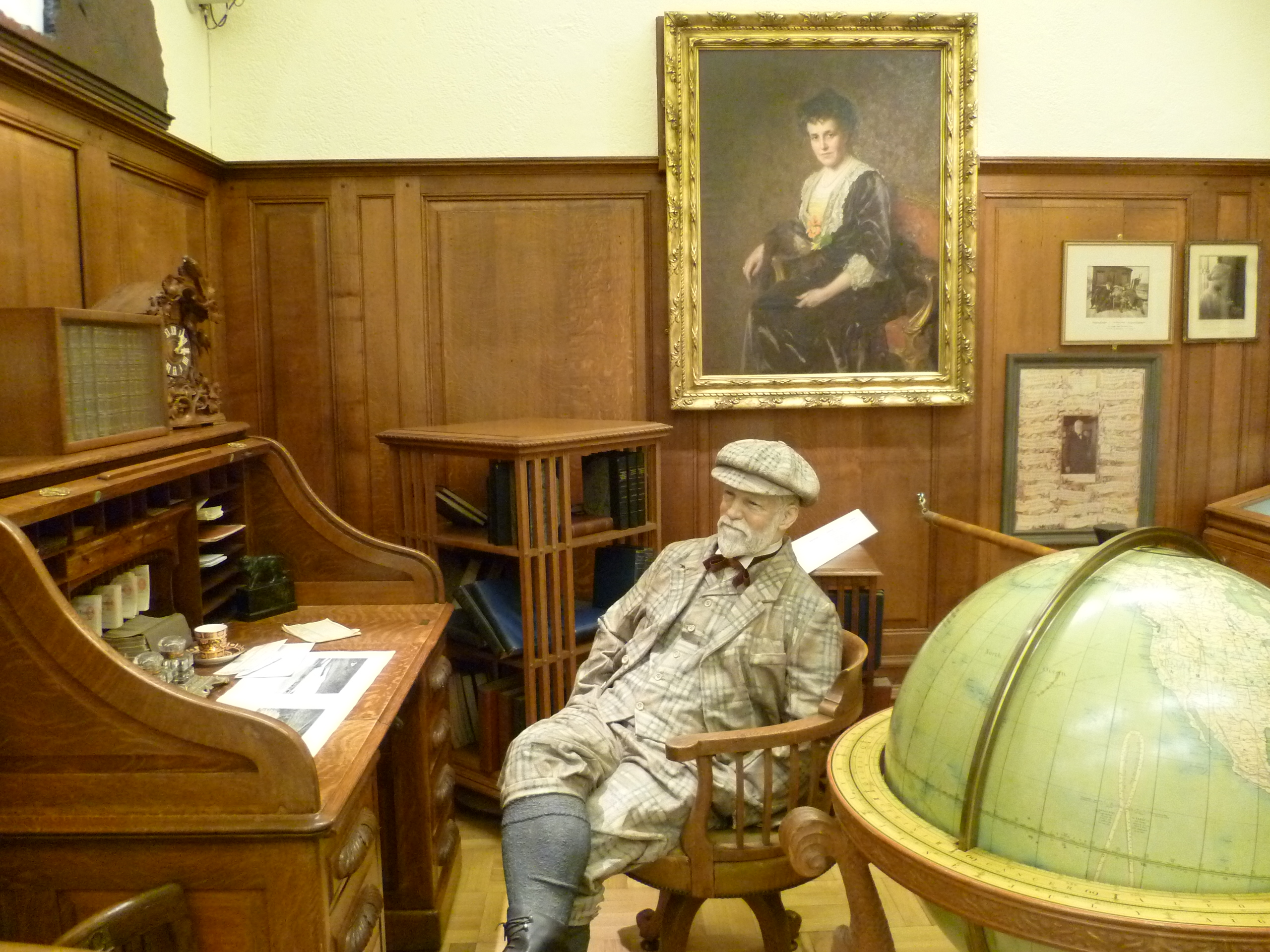
Display in the Andrew Carnegie Birthplace Museum

Dunfermline's most famous son is the entrepreneur and philanthropist Andrew Carnegie, who was born in the town in 1835. Among the gifts he gave to his home town are a free library and public swimming baths. Most important of all was the donation of the Pittencrieff Estate which he had purchased in 1903 to be converted into Pittencrieff Park. George Lauder, Andrew's "cousin-brother", a leading mechanical engineer, and his partner in the Carnegie Steel Company who would go on to be a board member of U.S. Steel. In 1888, two Dunfermline men, John Reid and Robert Lockhart, first demonstrated golf in the US by setting up a hole in an orchard, before Reid set up the USA’s first golf club the same year, Saint Andrew's Golf Club in Yonkers, New York, with Andrew Carnegie one of the first members.

A number of British monarchs were born in Dunfermline Palace. These include David II of Scotland (reign 1329–71), the son of Robert The Bruce in 1324; James I of Scotland (reign 1406–37) in late 1394 and Charles I, King of Scotland, England and Ireland (reign 1625–49) in 1600. James VI and I, the King of Scotland, England and Ireland and his wife, Anne of Denmark, the daughter of Frederick II of Denmark also lived at the Palace until the Union of the Crowns in 1603.

The 15th-century poet Robert Henryson, one of Scotland's most important literary figures during the period of the Northern Renaissance, was based in the town.

General John Forbes, who fought the French in the French and Indian War to capture Fort Duquesne and established the city of Pittsburgh, Pennsylvania, United States, was brought up in his family's ancestral home of Pittencrieff House (now within Pittencrieff Park).

Sir John Struthers, who dissected and drew the Tay Whale, was an anatomist and professor of medicine. He was born and brought up in Brucefield House, now demolished, which gives its name to a district of Dunfermline. The artist Sir Joseph Noel Paton was also born in the town.

Ebenezer Henderson (1784–1858), a minister and missionary, was born at the Linn near Dunfermline. His nephew Ebenezer Henderson (1809–1879), a science writer and historian born in Dunfermline, wrote The Annals of Dunfermline.

In popular culture, the singer Barbara Dickson; actor Kenneth Cranham; Dan McCafferty and Pete Agnew from the Scottish rock band Nazareth; Ian Anderson, singer and flautist of the progressive rock band Jethro Tull and Moira Shearer, ballerina and actress were all born in the town. Manny Charlton, guitarist and producer for Nazareth, emigrated to the town with his family in the 1940s and Stuart Adamson, rock guitarist with the Skids and frontman with Big Country, was brought up in nearby Crossgates and moved into the town with his family as a teenager. Film director – and former Skids frontman – Richard Jobson , who grew up in nearby Ballingry, went to school in Dunfermline and during the early part of the Skids' career lived, for a time, in the Pitcorthie area. Big Country's co-founder Bruce Watson, though born in Timmins, Ontario, was also brought up in the town, a few streets away from Pete Agnew and Manny Charlton. Alan Darby, of Cado Belle, also grew up in the town and attended Dunfermline High School.

In literature, the critically acclaimed author, Iain Banks; poet and novelist, John Burnside and Robert Gilfillan all have links to the town.

In sport, Caroline Weir of Real Madrid who was capped 102 times for Scotland national football team, Harry Lind of Dunfermline RFC who was capped sixteen times for the Scotland national rugby team and Jim Greenwood who played for Dunfermline RFC, Scotland and British and Irish Lions come from the town. Billy Liddell who played his entire career with Liverpool F.C. was born in nearby Townhill.

Other notable people include:

- Jim Crawford, racing driver
- Ralph Erskine, Secession minister
- John Erskine, recipient of the Victoria Cross
- Ncuti Gatwa, actor
- Alistair Hinton, composer
- Barry Horne, racing driver
- David Hunter, recipient of the Victoria Cross
- Louise Martin, sports administrator
- Shona McIsaac, Labour politician
- Jordan Smith, actor

== Twin cities ==
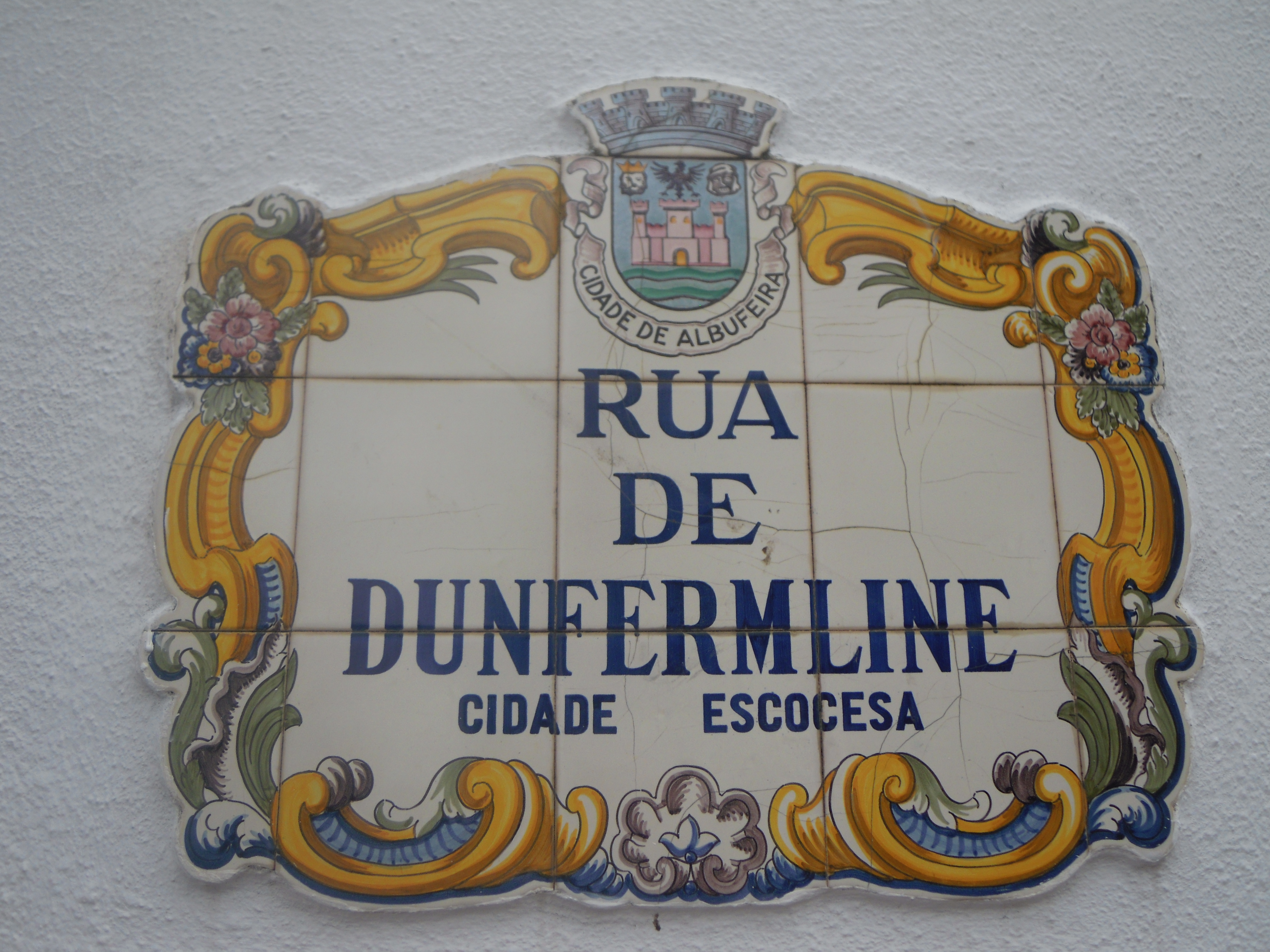
Street sign in the Rua de Dunfermline in the twin town of Albufeira, Portugal

Dunfermline is twinned with:

- Logroño, Spain (since 1990)
- Sarasota, Florida, United States (since 23 August 2001)
- Trondheim, Norway (since May 1945)
- Wilhelmshaven, Germany (since 24 August 1979)
- Vichy, France (since 1990)
- Albufeira, Portugal (since May 1995)

== Arms ==
Coat of arms of Dunfermline

Notes
Granted 21 August 2024 by Joseph Morrow, Lord Lyon King of Arms.
Coronet
A crown appropriate to a city.
Escutcheon
Azure on a rock Proper two lions supporting a tower with four steps Argent masoned Sable windows and portcullis Gules both lions crowned Or.
Supporters
Dexter a lion rampant Argent armed and langued Gules and sinister a unicorn Argent armed maned and unguled Or and gorged with a collar Gules from which is pendent an oval badge Azure fimbriated Or charged with a saltire Argent.
Motto
Esto Rupes Inaccessa

== See also ==
- List of listed buildings in Dunfermline, Fife
- Dunfermline Vikings
- Sir Patrick Spens
- Wallace's Well
