= Kingsgate, Dunfermline =

Kingsgate Shopping Centre
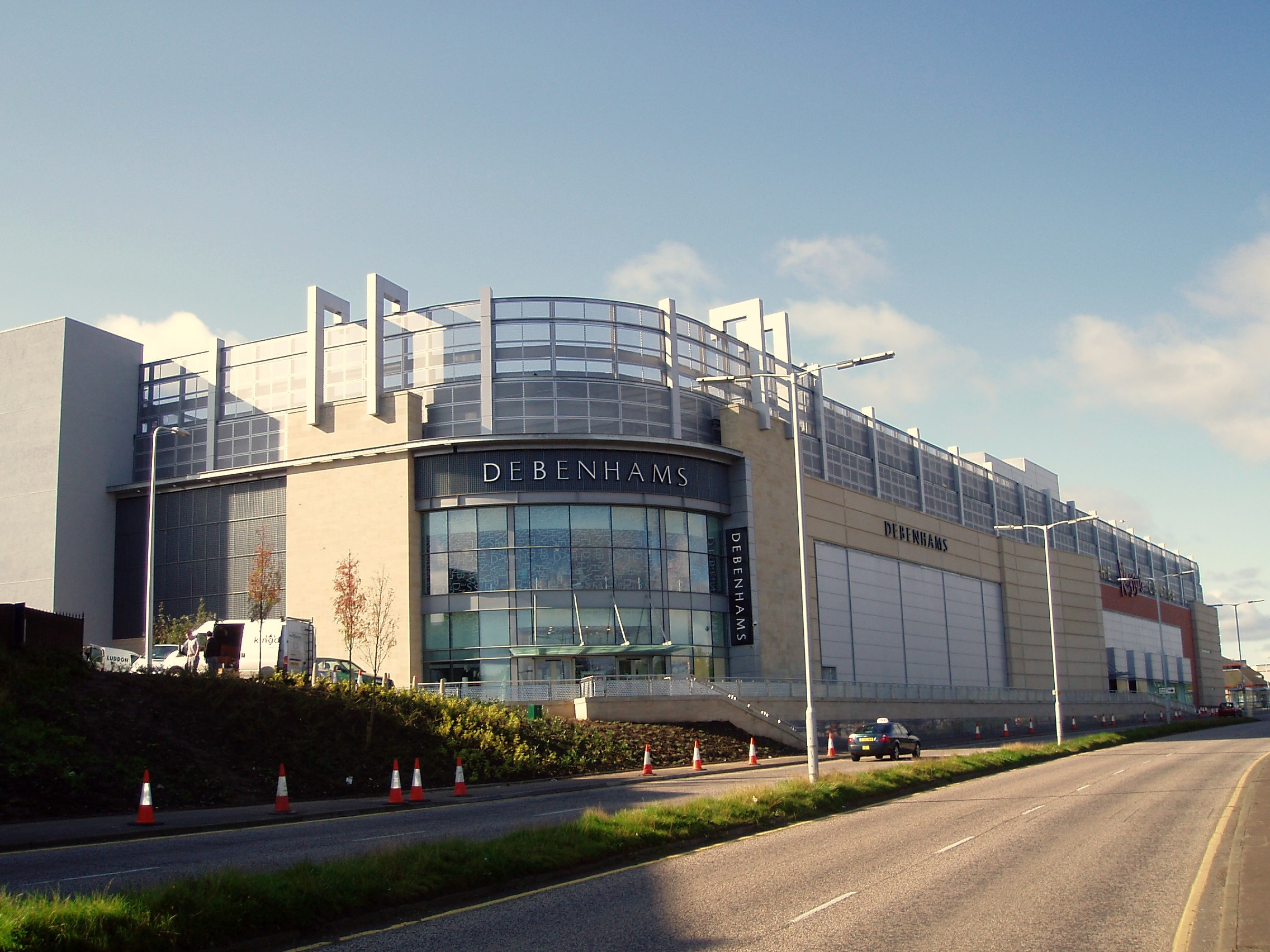
- Location: Dunfermline, Fife, Scotland
- Coordinates: 56.07241°N 3.45904°W
- Opened: 1985; 2008 (extension)
- Developer: Erne Ltd; Balfour kilpatrick (extension only)
- Owner: Terra Firma
- Architect: Keppie
- Num. of anchor tenants: 2
- Floor area: 35,000 m^{2} (380,000 sq ft)
- Parking: 711
- Website: shopkingsgate.co.uk

The Kingsgate Centre is an indoor shopping centre located in the city centre of Dunfermline, Fife, Scotland. Marks and Spencer and the former Debenhams store anchors the main entrances to the shopping centre. The Kingsgate was extended in 2008 at which time it also underwent significant refurbishment. The centre has a three-storey car park on the roof and contains 74 retail units over two floors.
