= Duloch =

Residential suburb of Dunfermline in Fife, Scotland

Coordinates: 56.0625°N 3.4019°W

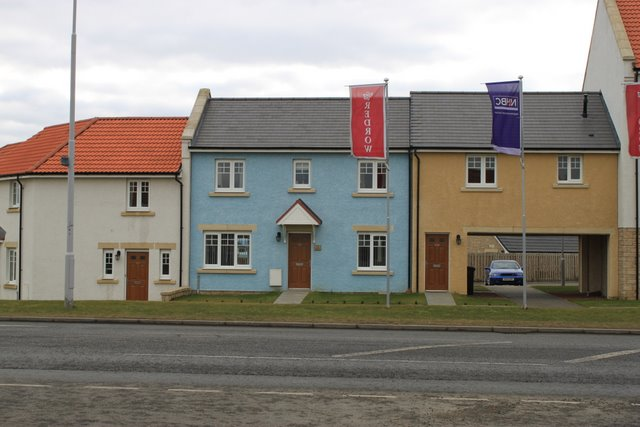
Houses at Middlebank Rise

Duloch (/ˈduːlɒx/ DOO-lokh), or Duloch Park, is a residential suburb of Dunfermline, in Fife, Scotland.

The closest railway stations are Rosyth, Dunfermline Queen Margaret, Dunfermline City, Dalgety Bay and Inverkeithing.

The lower price of large homes compared to homes across the Forth, as well as its proximity to the M90 motorway, has attracted many Edinburgh commuters.

Local amenities include two large supermarkets (Tesco and Aldi) and a small shopping area. The nearby 'Fife Leisure Park' contains a cinema, gym, bowling alley, other leisure facilities and restaurants. Three primary schools serve the area - Masterton, Duloch and Carnegie Primaries. The campus of Duloch Primary school contains a large public library, café, gym, astro turf, several halls used for sports and community classes and Calaiswood, a special education school.

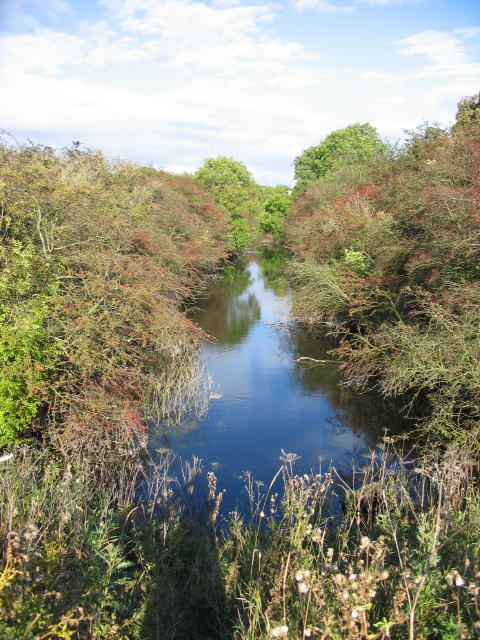
Old quarry workings

Duloch Park and Calais Muir Wood form the heart of the Duloch suburb, the latter being an ancient woodland owned by Fife Council and maintained by the Fife Coast and Countryside Trust. Duloch Park is mainly open grassland with a large pond to the north, a flooded former quarry. Its flat terrain is one reason for the large number of sustainable urban drainage system ponds in the area.

== Name ==
Historically, Duloch was spelled Dow Loch, as can be seen in the Blaeu Atlas of Scotland, published in 1654 by Joan Blaeu (1596–1673), and the Roy Military Survey, 1747–1755. Duloch is from Scottish Gaelic dubh loch, 'black loch'.

The name Calais (pronounced /ˈkeɪlɪs/ KAY-liss) is derived from the Gaelic coille with the suffix -us, meaning 'place of woodland'. It has no connection to the town in France, hence the different pronunciation.

== Attractions ==
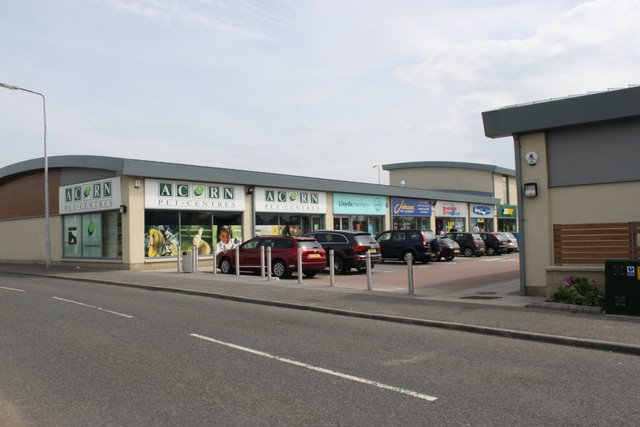
Shops in Duloch

Historic buildings include Category A listed Old Duloch House, described as "an ancient mansion". To the south is Pitreavie Castle and doocot and to the east, across the M90 motorway is the privately owned Fordell Castle, the Fordell Estate and the Fordell Firs National Scout Camp.

== Development ==
The modern estate was developed as part of the 'Dunfermline and the Coast Local Plan' as developed by Fife Council in the late 1990s. The land was mainly farmland until that point, with few old stone quarries, some of which remain and are now flooded.
