= Abbot House, Dunfermline =

Historic house in Dunfermline, Scotland

Coordinates: 56.070395°N 3.463143°W

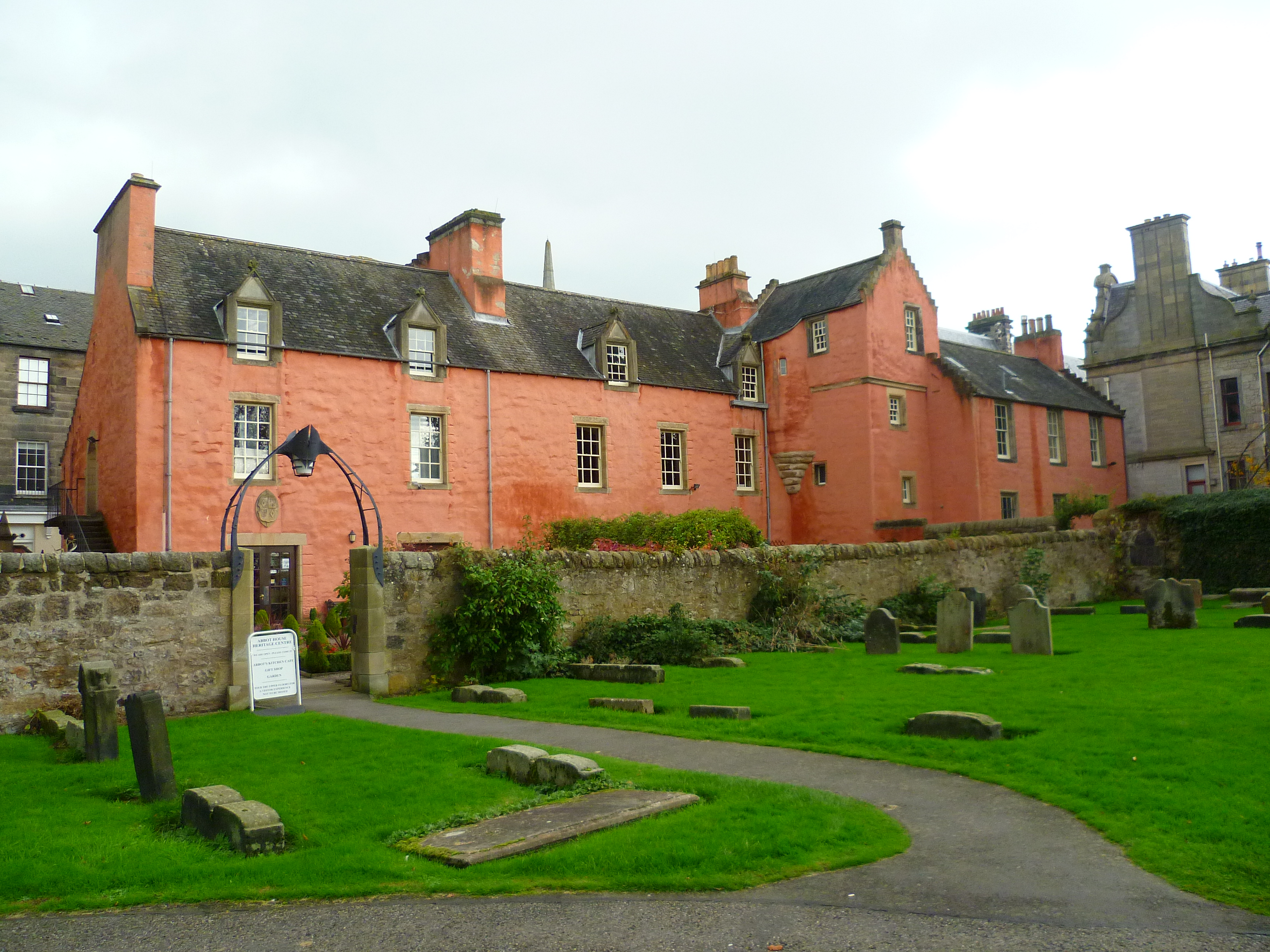
The Abbot House seen from the grounds of Dunfermline Abbey

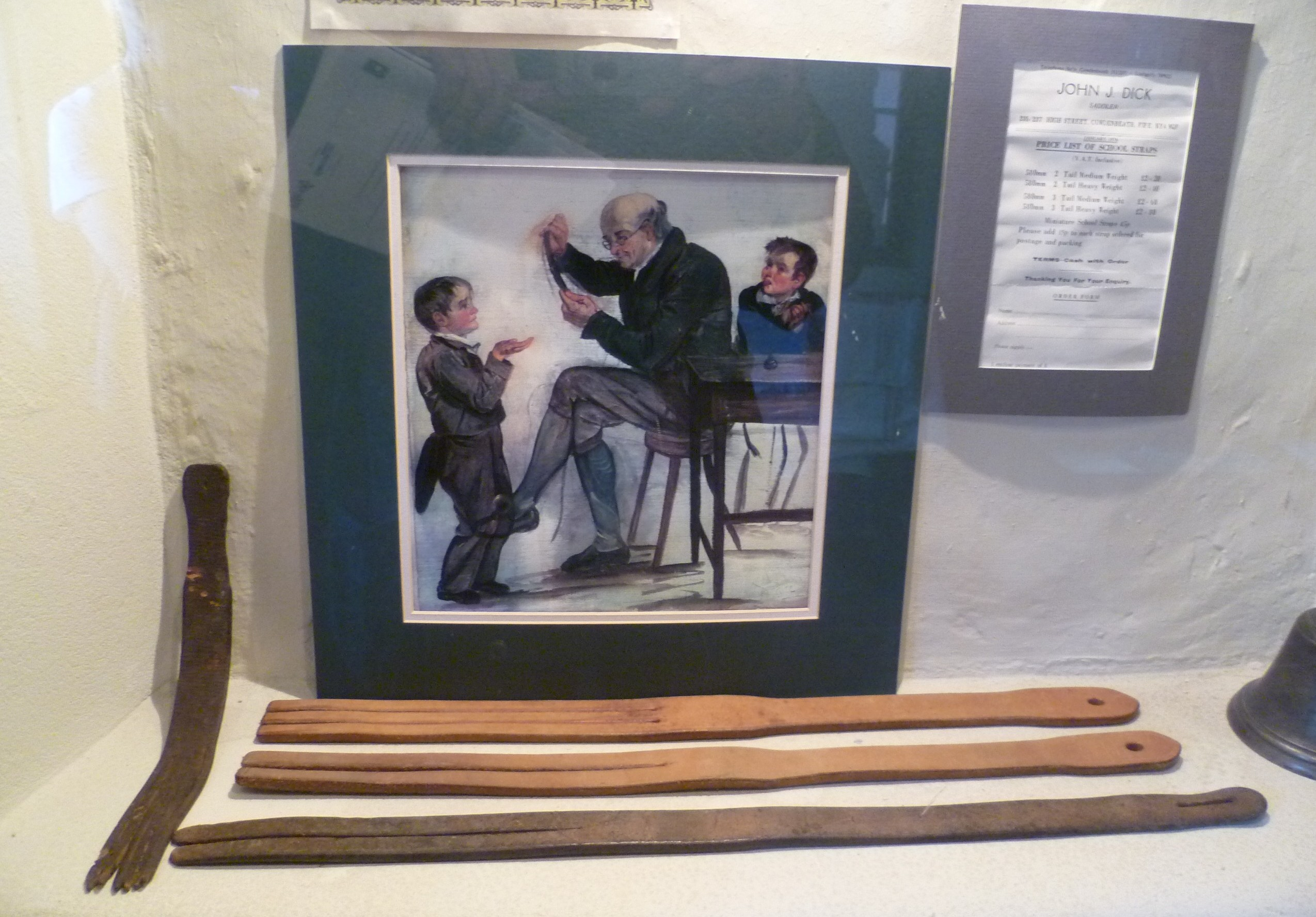
An exhibit in Abbot House. The painting is 'The Dominie Functions' (1826) by George Harvey (1806–1876). The objects in front of the painting are tawses.

Abbot House is the oldest secular building in Dunfermline, Scotland. Lying in the shadow of Dunfermline's great abbey church, the core of the building is 16th-century. A heritage centre until August 2015, the centre closed following failed attempts by Abbot House Heritage Centre Trust to find alternative funding.

In March 2016 it was announced that the Carnegie Dunfermline Trust had taken over ownership of Abbot House, and that they intend to re-open the building to the public. In November 2016 it was announced that Fire Station Creative had been earmarked as the preferred operator, although plans had yet to be finalised and no indication of a possible re-opening date was given. In May 2017 it was reported that a re-opened Abbot House would provide a cafe, restaurant, meeting rooms and suites, and that it was the intention to re-open the cafe "as soon as possible".

In July 2018 the Carnegie Dunfermline Trust provided an update which stated that 70% of the funding for reopening Abbot House had been secured.

== History ==
As the oldest surviving secular building within Dunfermline town, and a survivor of the Great Fire of Dunfermline in 1624, the building is indicative of the changing styles of Scottish architecture from the 16th to the 20th centuries.

The earliest phase of the house was a two-story rectangular block of at least two storeys, built into the existing precinct wall. This house incorporated a small Z-plan tower house. The tour of the house reveals many early features of the changing form of the house, including crow-stepped gabling from an early exterior wall.

Highlights include a frescoed wall painting, dated to 1571, which may depict scenes from a middle-Scots translation of Virgil, in the principal room of the first floor of the house, as well as a 14th-century tracery window.

Trial excavations were begun in the garden of the house in 1988, followed by further work in 1992, and again in 1993 and 1994, excavating eleven separate areas in total. Excavations within the garden in the 1990s revealed various finds, including a very large dog, likely a deer or wolfhound, that measured approximately 86 cm at the shoulder. Other finds included a selection of medieval glazed and unglazed pottery sherds, costume fittings and personal accessories, and ironwork. Two ceramic 'counters', associated with medieval and early modern games and gambling, and a selection of clay pipes, were found on site. Early coinage, from the 14th to the 17th century, was also discovered.

== Motto ==
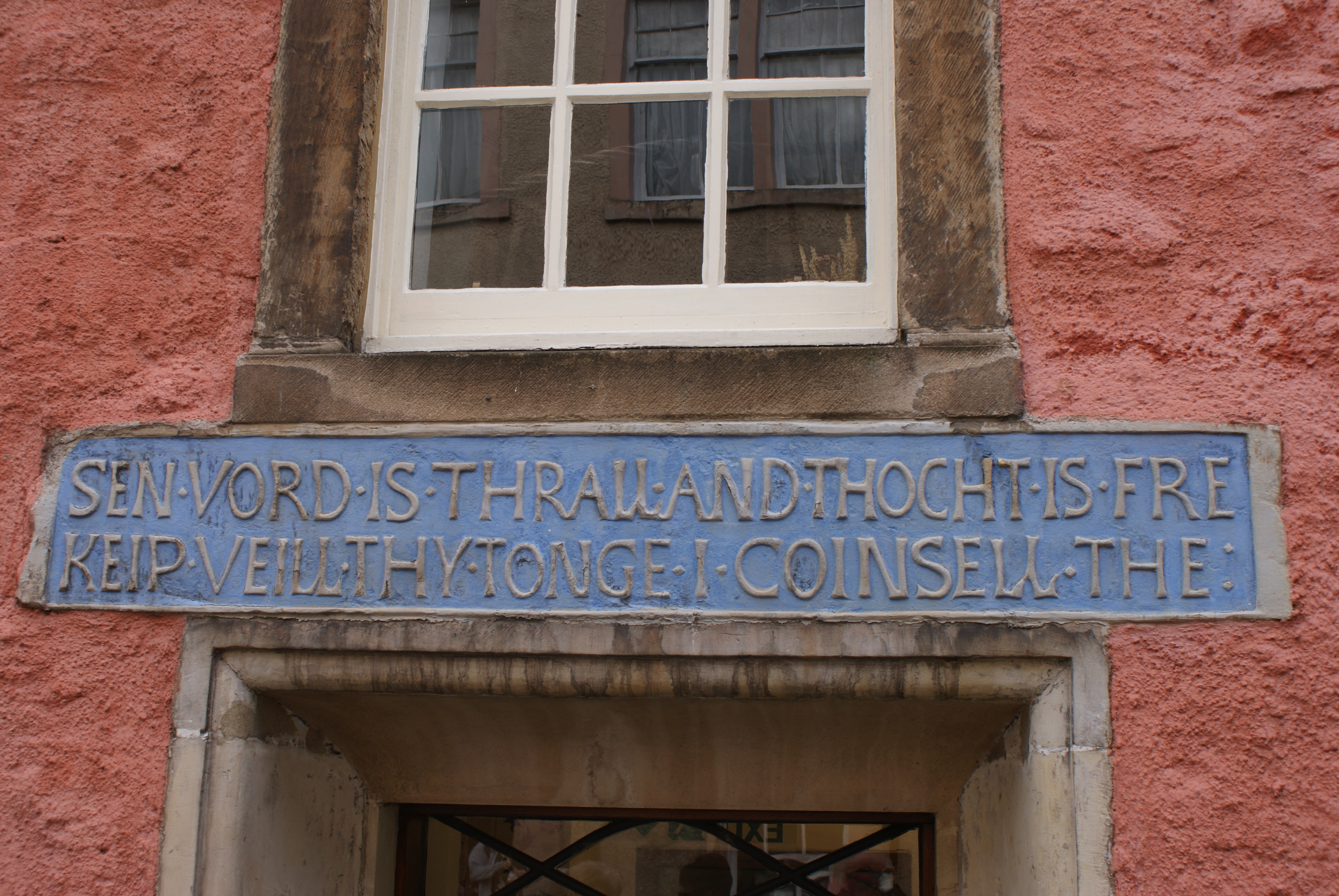
Motto 'Sen vord is thrall' on front of Abbot House

The front of the house bears the motto 'Sen vord is thrall and thocht is fre : Keip veill thy tonge I coinsell the' (Since word is thrall and thought is free: keep well thy tongue I counsel thee) (see illustration).

The motto was set there for Robert Pitcairn, Commendator of Dunfermline (d 1584).
