= Carlingnose Point Nature Reserve =

Protected area in Fife, Scotland

- Site of Special Scientific Interest
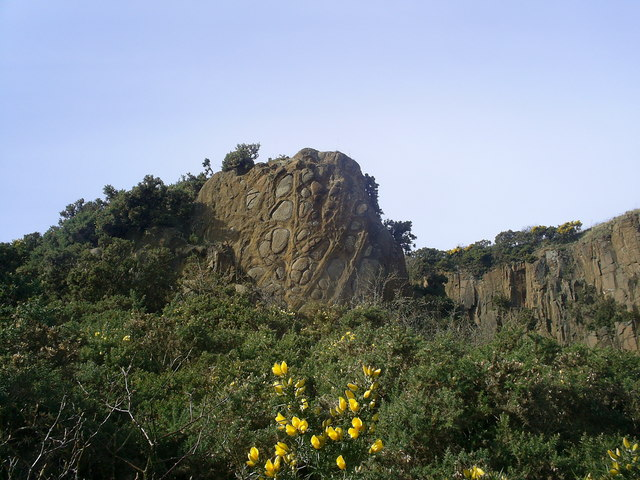
- Carlingnose Point Nature Reserve

- Location within Fife
- Location of Carlingnose Point Nature Reserve.
- Area of search: North Queensferry
- Coordinates: 56.011707°N 3.389194°W
- Interest: Nature Reserve

Carlingnose Point Nature Reserve is a Site of Special Scientific Interest located in North Queensferry, Fife, Scotland.

== Location ==
Carlingnose Point Nature Reserve is located on the North Queensferry Peninsula. It overlooks Inverkeithing Bay to the east, and the Forth Bridge to the south. The town of Inverkeithing lies to the north.

The Fife Coastal Path, one of Scotland's Great Trails, passes through Carlingnose Point Nature Reserve.

== Wildlife ==
=== Plants ===
Carlingnose Point Nature Reserve is a Site of Special Scientific Interest (SSSI), owing to its high degree of habitat and plant diversity. A grassland, over 170 species have been recorded at the site.

The Scottish Wildlife Trust identify plant highlights of Carlingnose Point to be field gentian and dropwort.

The Scottish Wilderness Trust list Bloody Cranesbill, Lesser Meadow-Rue, Bell Heather, Burnet Saxifrage and Hairy Rockcress among plant species found at Carlingnose Point Nature Reserve SSSI. Heather and Harebell, listed as priority species in Fife's Biodiversity Action Plan, occur on the site.

=== Birds ===
The dense gorse allows for nesting sites for finches and warblers. Fulmars can be spotted circling. The Scottish Wildlife Trust list bird highlights as common terns and lesser whitethroat.

== History ==
It has been suggested the name Carlingnose comes from the appearance of the site to mariners sailing up the Firth of Forth, to whom it looked like an old witch.

Quarrying of the dolerite rock at the site began in the early 19th century; the rock was used in the building of the bases for the Forth Bridge.

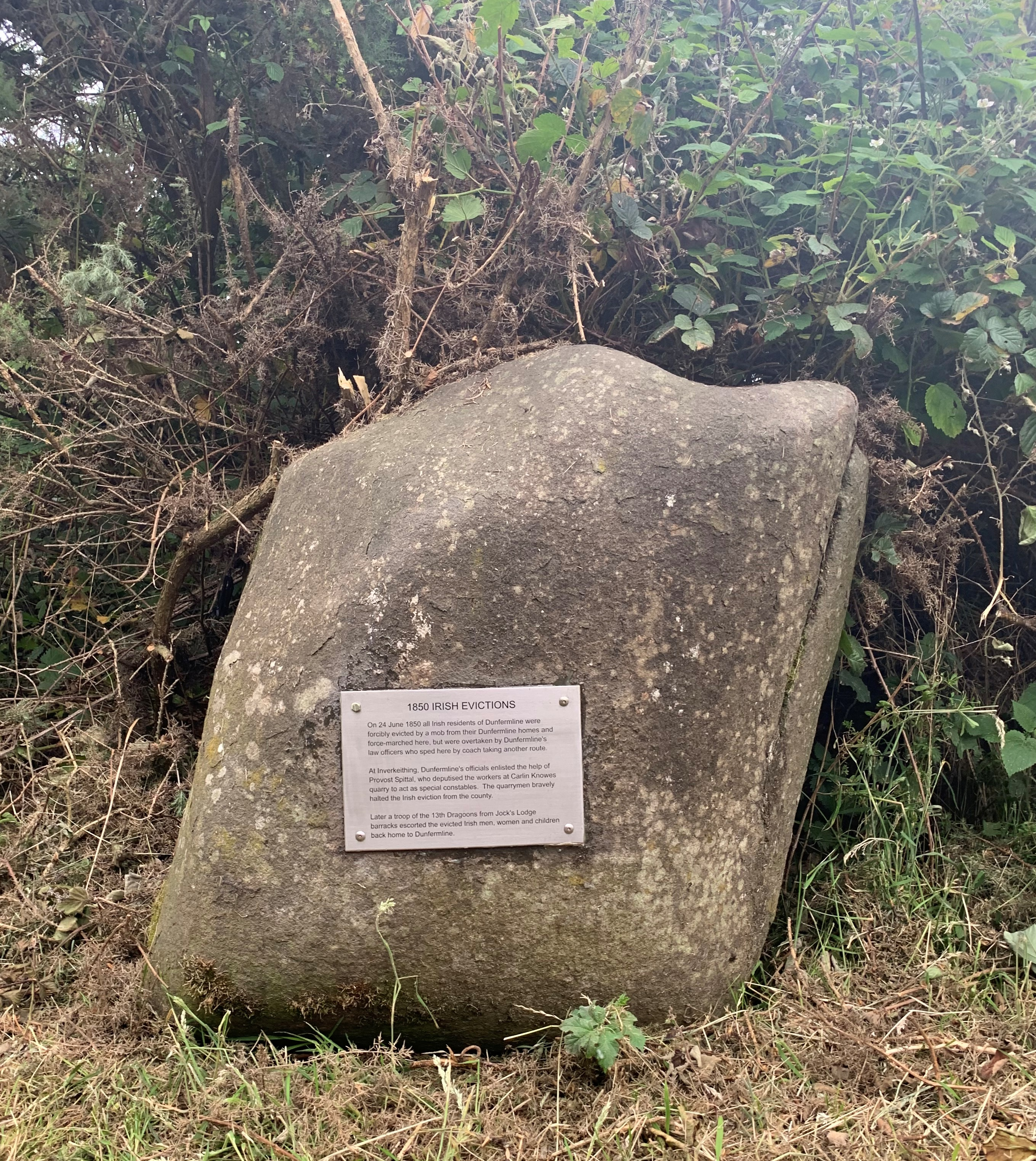
1850 Irish evictions memorial near the former Carlingnose quarry.

On 24 June 1850, all Irish residents of Dunfermline were forcibly evicted by a mob from their Dunfermline homes. Workers of Carlin Knowes quarry were deputised by Provost Spittal of Inverkeithing to halt the evictions. The Irish eviction was halted successfully.

Carlingnose Point was largely sold to the War Department in 1898 when barracks and a gun site were constructed. The site housed two cannons for coastal defence, which were later replaced by anti-aircraft guns for the Second World War.
