= Ferry Hills SSSI =

Protected area in Fife, Scotland

Ferry Hills
- Site of Special Scientific Interest
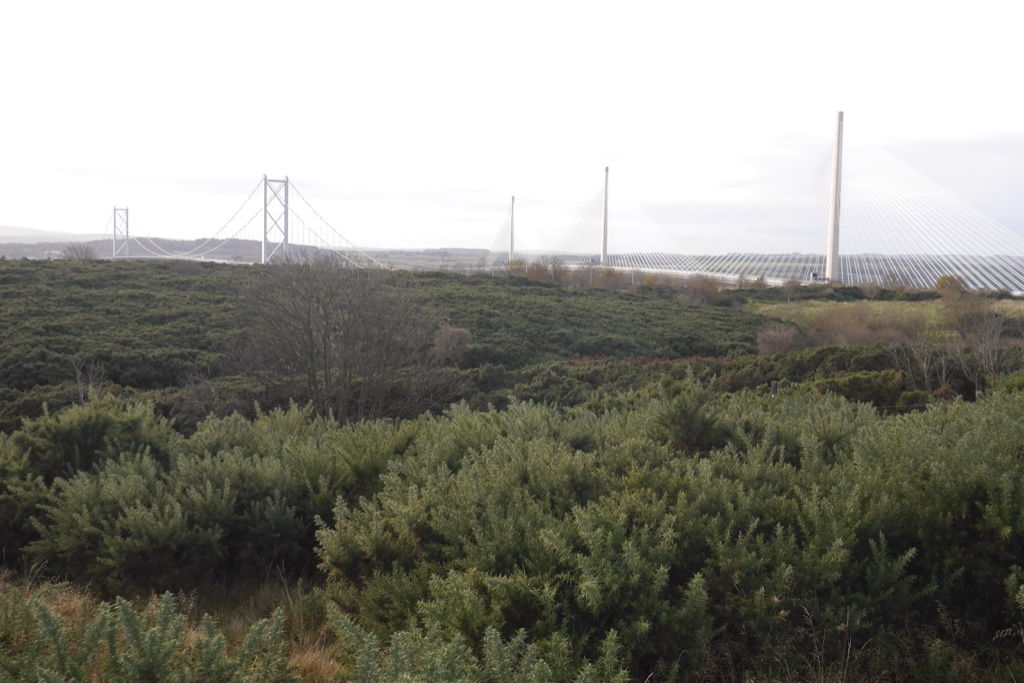
- Ferry Hills looking south to [Forth Road Bridge]
- Location of Ferry Hills.
- Interest: geological and biological (southern section only)
- Area: 22.16 ha (54.8 acres)
- Notification date: 28 February 1992

Ferry Hills SSSI (site of special scientific interest) is a nature protected area noted for its geology and grasslands. It is located in Inverkeithing and North Queensferry in Fife, Scotland.

== Description ==
Ferry Hills is made up of five separate locations within Inverkeithing and North Queensferry. Its total land area is 22.16 ha. It is noted for its geological interest, and the southern part of the site is noted for biological interest.

The south of the site occupies a small hill; the west of the site includes Ferry Loch, a seasonally flooded basin mire; and the north of the site is Fairykirk with its disused quarry. There is an underground reservoir on top of the hill in the grassland part of the SSSI.

The site is notable for the following species:

- nationally scarce dropwort
- nationally scarce spring cinquefoil
- locally scarce wild liquorice
- wormwood
- field gentian
- soapwort
- knotted hedgeparsley

== Past and present management ==
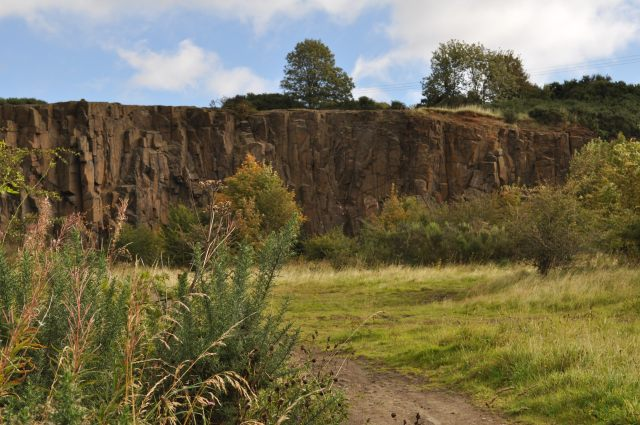
Fairykirk Quarry, Fairykirk, Inverkeithing.

The SSSI was cut into by the railway in the 19th century, and roads in the 20th century.

The site was designated a site of special scientific interest on 28 February 1992 by NatureScot.

Grassland on the site ceased to be grazed by cattle in October 1994.

In 2010 and 2017, natural features of the SSSI were rated as in declining status.

The grassland areas immediately north of North Queensferry are used by walkers and dogs. Fairy Kirk Quarry is popular with rock climbers and features in the local Scottish Mountaineering Club guide.
