= Caldwell's Paper Mill =

Paper mill in Fife, Scotland

Coordinates: 56.0277°N 3.3975°W

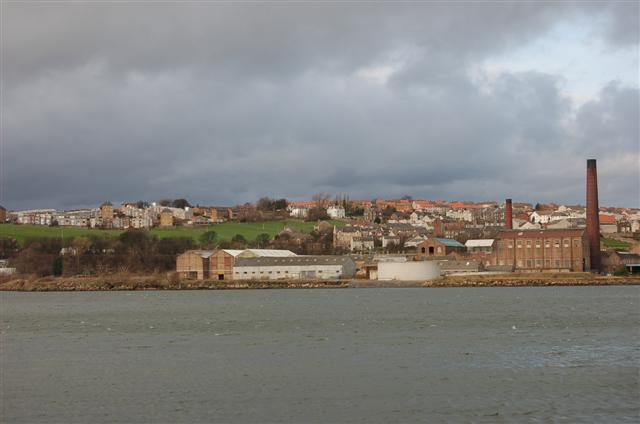
- Caldwell's Paper Mill as viewed from Inverkeithing Bay (2007)
- Built: 1914
- Operated: 1914–2003
- Industry: paper mill
- Owner: Caldwell Paper Company 1914–1928; Inveresk Paper Company 1928–2003

Caldwell's Paper Mill was a paper mill complex in Inverkeithing in Fife, Scotland. The mill opened in 1914, closed in 2003 and was demolished in 2012.

== History ==
Caldwell's Paper Mill opened by the Caldwell Paper Company in 1914. It was built on the site of an earlier sawmill and paper mill.

In 1928, the Caldwell Paper Company name changed to the Inveresk Paper Company.

In 2003, the paper mill closed, with 150 job losses, and in 2012, the main site was demolished.

In 2022, Fife Historic Buildings Trust published a podcast and video memories of Inverkeithing Paper Mill, reflecting the lived experience of those who worked at the site.

== Current site ==
The site's National Record of the Historic Environment (NRHE) ID is 68088.

The site has been owned by the Purvis group since 2013, and future development is a possibility for the site.

== Photographs ==
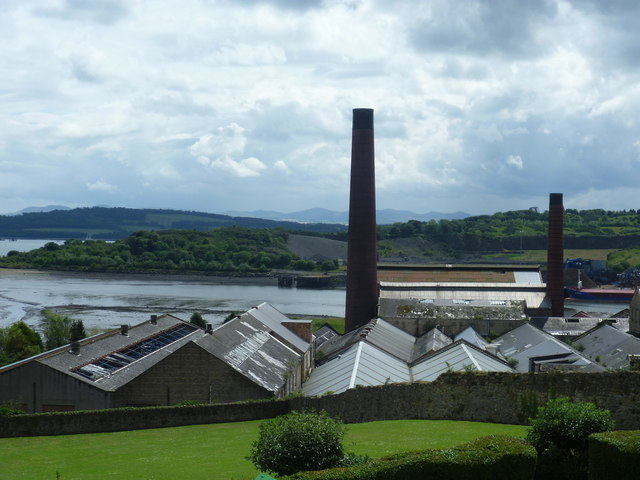
Caldwell's Paper Mill as viewed from Inverkeithing Friary gardens (2011)

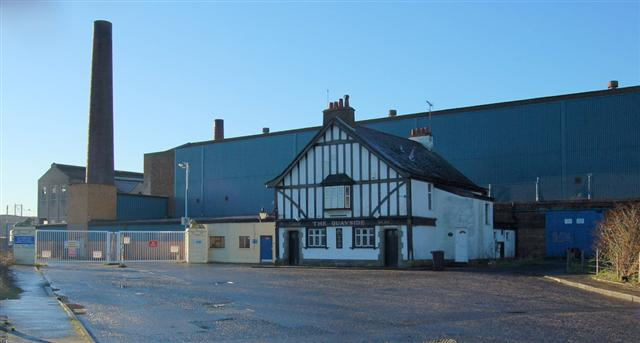
Front entrance to Caldwell's Paper Mill (2007)

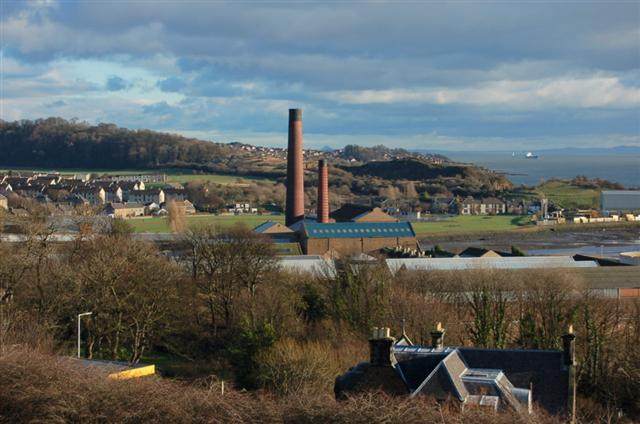
Caldwell's Paper Mill south aspect (2007)
