= Port Laing =

Bay in Fife, Scotland

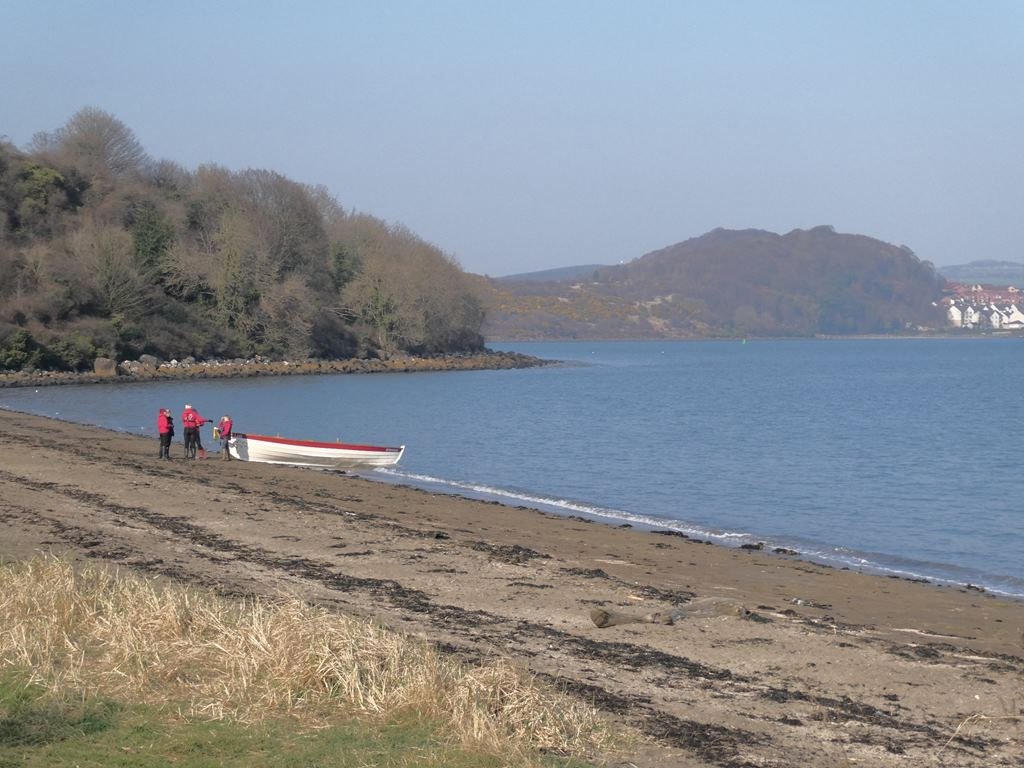
- Port Laing beach in 2013
- Interactive map of Port Laing
- Location: Fife
- Coordinates: 56.016211°N 3.390092°W
- Type: Bay

Port Laing is a small bay in North Queensferry in Fife, Scotland, and an inlet of Inverkeithing Bay within the Firth of Forth.

Port Laing has a sandy beach. It lies on the Fife Coastal Path, adjacent to Carlingnose Point Nature Reserve.

== History ==
On July 20, 1651, Port Laing was where Oliver Cromwell's forces of 4,000 soldiers landed to fight the Battle of Inverkeithing, the decisive final battle of the Wars of the Three Kingdoms in Scotland.

Port Laing is named as such in an 1856 Ordinance Survey 6 inch map. The name origin of Port Laing, according to the University of Glasgow, is uncertain; it could contain the common Scottish surname Laing or derive from port long meaning ‘harbour of ships’ (in Gallic, the word long means ‘ship’).

Opened in 1912 a Royal Navy Air station operated at Port Laing, known as RNAS Port Laing. This is said to be the first military air station in Scotland. The station had three sheds, each containing a seaplane, and was located on the shore. It later became clear Port Laing was not an ideal location, exposed to winds blowing up the Firth of Forth, and the station ceased to operate in either 1914 or 1917.

At Port Liang on 20 June 1916, Lt. George Paton of 9th Battalion, Royal Scottish Fusiliers, age 21, gave his life to save his men when a grenade was badly thrown. He is commemorated on a plaque at Port Laing.

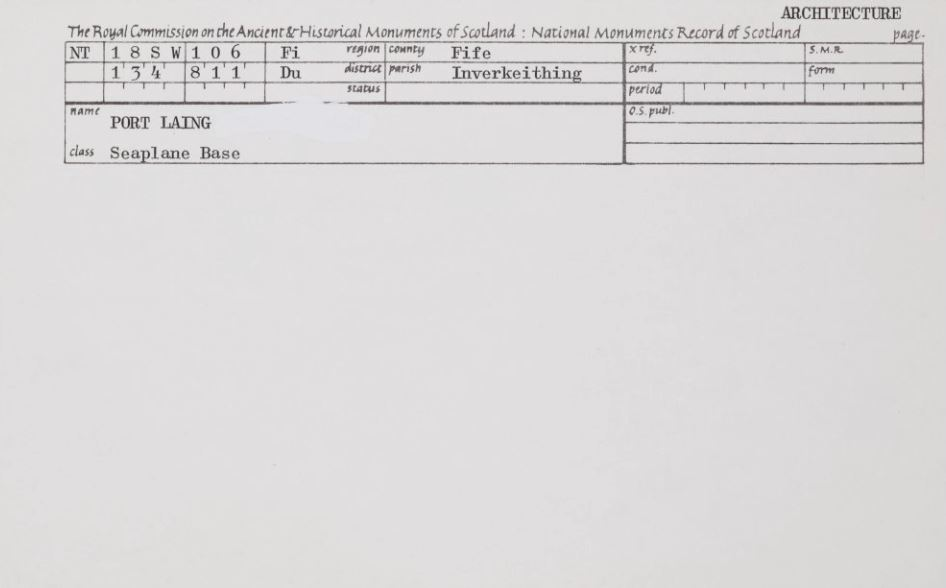
Port Laing seaplane base National Monuments Record of Scotland card.

Naval presence at Port Laing, c. 1912.
