= Boreland Road Bridge =

Bridge in Fife, Scotland

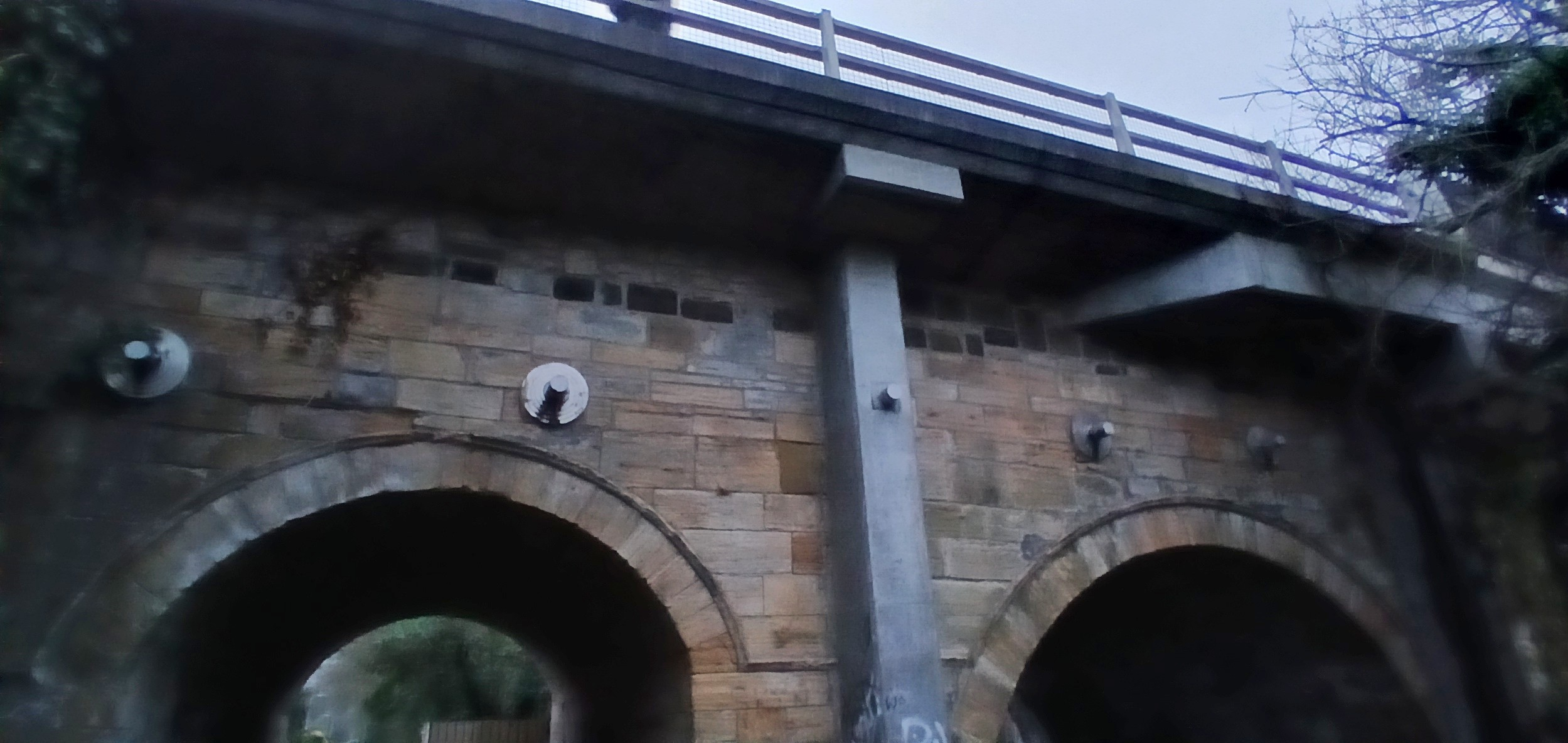
- Arches of Boreland Road Bridge over the Keithing Burn and the former Halbeath Waggon Way
- Coordinates: 56.03389°N 3.39510°W
- OS grid reference: NT 13166 83211
- Locale: Fife

History
- Built: 1829

Listed Building – Category B
- Official name: Boreland Road, Bridge Over Keithing Burn, Halbeath Waggon Way and Railway
- Designated: 4 August 2004
- Reference no.: LB49935

Location
- Interactive map of Boreland Road Bridge

Boreland Road Bridge was built in 1829 and spans the Keithing Burn and railway line in Inverkeithing in Fife, Scotland.

== History ==
Boreland Road was first opened in 1784. It is likely at this time that the Mill Bridge, named after a nearby flour mill, was built to span the Keithing Burn and the recently opened Halbeath Waggon Way, which transported materials from Halbeath to Inverkeithing Harbour.

By 1829, Mill Bridge had fallen into disrepair. On 19 January 1829, plans for Boreland Road Bridge were drawn by Mr Peddie of Inverkeithing. John Menzies of Dunfermline was the builder. The total cost of Boreland Road Bridge was £102-0-11p.

The span of the bridge was altered in 1877 with the introduction of the Dunfermline & Queensferry Railway line; and altered again in 1890 with the completion of the Forth Bridge.

The upper roadway of the bridge was widened in the 20th century, and the current railway bridge archway was replaced in the 1970s.

1829 blueprint for Boreland Road Bridge by John Menzies of Dunfermline.

1903 postcard of 15 to 7 Boreland Road, former sweet shop at the west approach to the bridge.

== Description ==
The bridge has three arches: one over the former Halbeath Waggon Way, now a pedestrian path; one over the Keithing Burn, and one over the current railway line.

To the north of the bridge is Inverkeithing Railway station and to the south is Inverkeithing south junction, Inverkeithing tunnel and the Forth Bridge.

== Listed status designation ==
On 4 August 2004, Boreland Road Bridge was granted Category B listed status from Historic Scotland, reserved for "major examples of a particular period, style or building type".

In their statement of special interest, Historic Scotland noted:

"the bridge at Boreland Road is the most tangible evidence still in existence of the former Halbeath Waggon Way, an important early wooden railway line of the late 18th century. In addition, various late 19th century alterations to this bridge also represent the history of railway communications at this period, in particular the advent of the Forth Bridge Railway (1883-1890)".

== See also ==
- List of bridges in Scotland
