= Inverkeithing Bay =

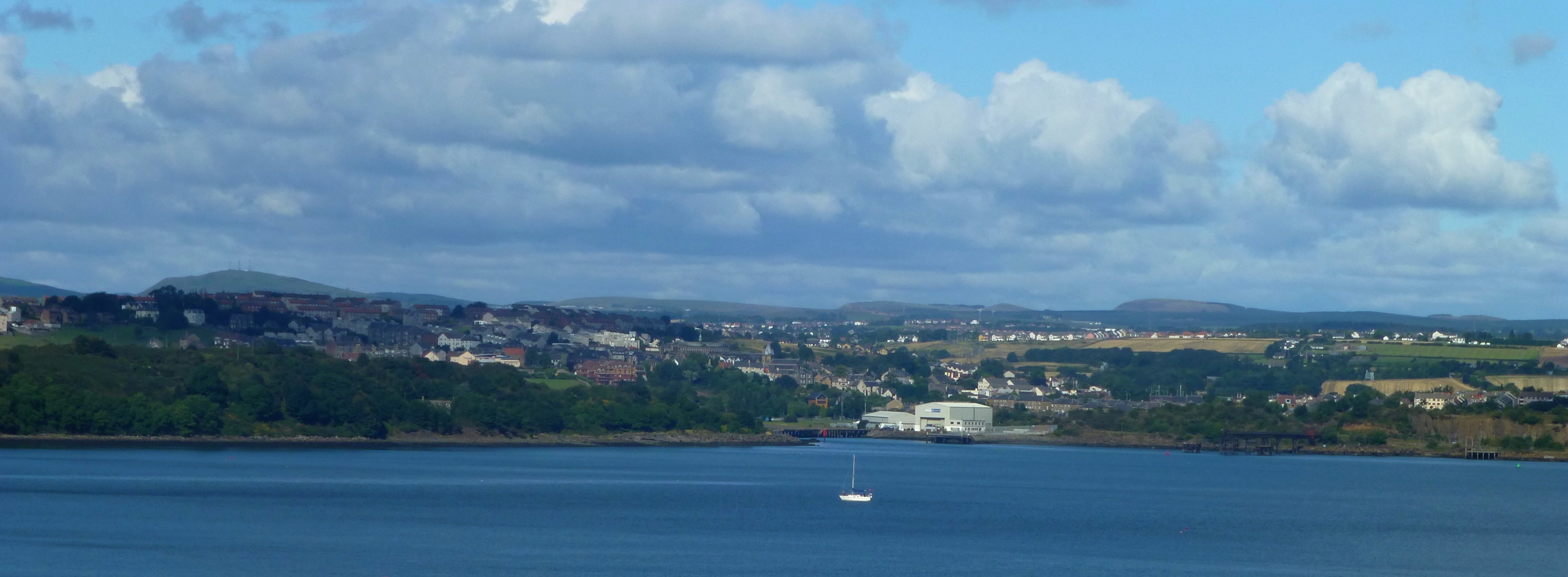
- Inverkeithing Bay, overlooking Inverkeithing.
- Interactive map of Inverkeithing Bay
- Location: Scotland Fife
- Coordinates: 56.020716°N 3.379367°W
- Type: Bay
- Part of: The Firth of Forth
- Basin countries: Scotland

Inverkeithing Bay is a bay on the north shore of the Firth of Forth in Scotland. Settlements on Inverkeithing Bay are North Queensferry, Inverkeithing and Dalgety Bay.

== Geography ==
Inverkeithing Bay extends from North Queensferry in the south to Dalgety Bay in the east. The bay takes its name from Inverkeithing, southeast of the bay, which means "mouth of the river Keithing".

The bay has three main inlets:

- Port Laing, a small bay with a sandy beach.
- Inner bay, the location of Inverkeithing harbour between East Ness and West Ness and the mouth of the Keithing Burn.
- St David's harbour, now home to an exclusive housing development.

== History ==
Inverkeithing Bay has long been a convenient sheltered crossing point of the Firth of Forth. Dean (1981) argues the north end of the Queensferry passage was located at Inverkeithing Bay, evidenced by a charter of Pope Alexander in 1163 which refers to "the passage of Inverkeithing". Recorded evidence shows the Bay has been used as a landing place for ships crossing the Firth of Forth since at least the 14th century.

Inverkeithing Harbour was first recorded in 1587. Other harbours have operated at East Ness, West Ness and St David's harbour.

In 1651, in anticipation of Inverkeithing Bay being used as the crossing point north for Cromwell's Army during the Wars of the Three Kingdoms, military authorities blocked much of the passage into Inverkeithing Bay by "casting great stones" and also "sinking ships and barques". That same year Cromwell instead landed his ships at Port Laing, a small inlet of the bay, with 4,000 troops, to begin the Battle of Inverkeithing.

Royal Navy ships sheltered during winter storms in Inverkeithing Bay during the Georgian era, and Mediterranean vessels were quarantined here. Inverkeithing Lazaretto was a land lazaretto established on the west side of Inverkeithing bay in 1810, for marine quanantine.

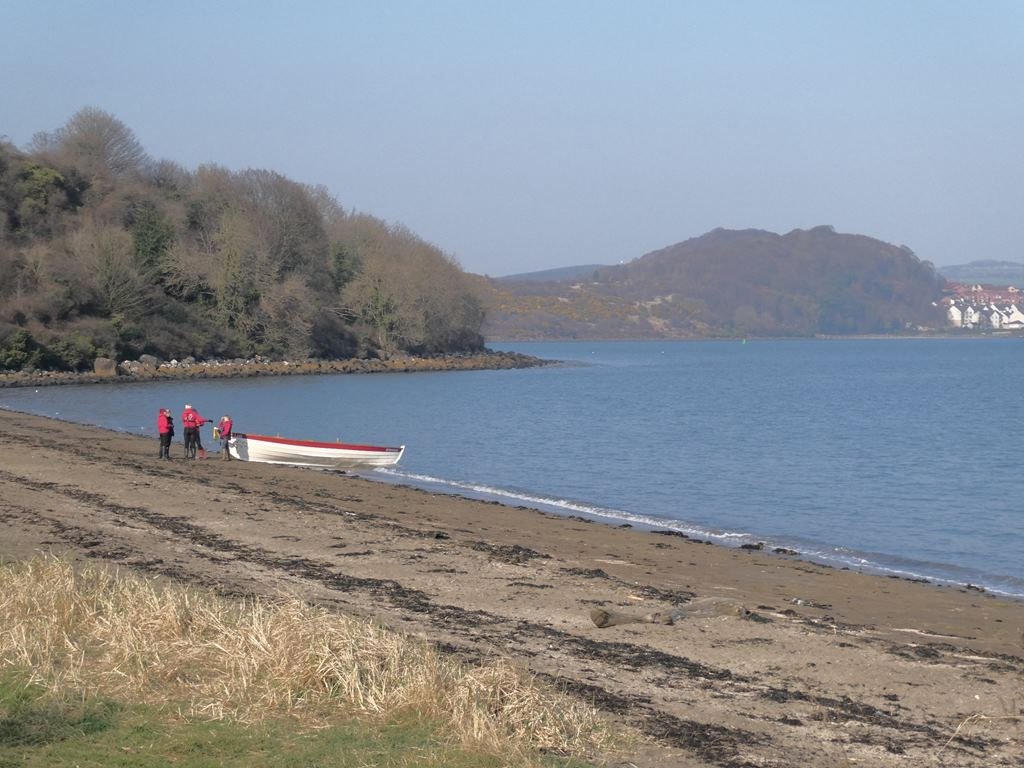
Port Laing Beach, Inverkeithing Bay.

A harbour was added at Port Liang inlet around 1898. Beginning in 1912, a Royal Naval Air Station operated on the Port Laing inlet of Inverkeithing Bay. With sheds containing seaplanes, this is said to be the first military air station in Scotland.

In 2003 the Fife Coastal Path opened, allowing visitors to walk around Inverkeithing Bay as part of the long-distance footpath - one of Scotland's Great Trails.

== Wildlife ==
Inverkeithing Bay is designated a Ramsar Site, a Site of Special Scientific Interest and a Special Protected Area.

Inverkeithing Bay is home to common seals, which bask on the rocks close to shore.

== Photographs ==
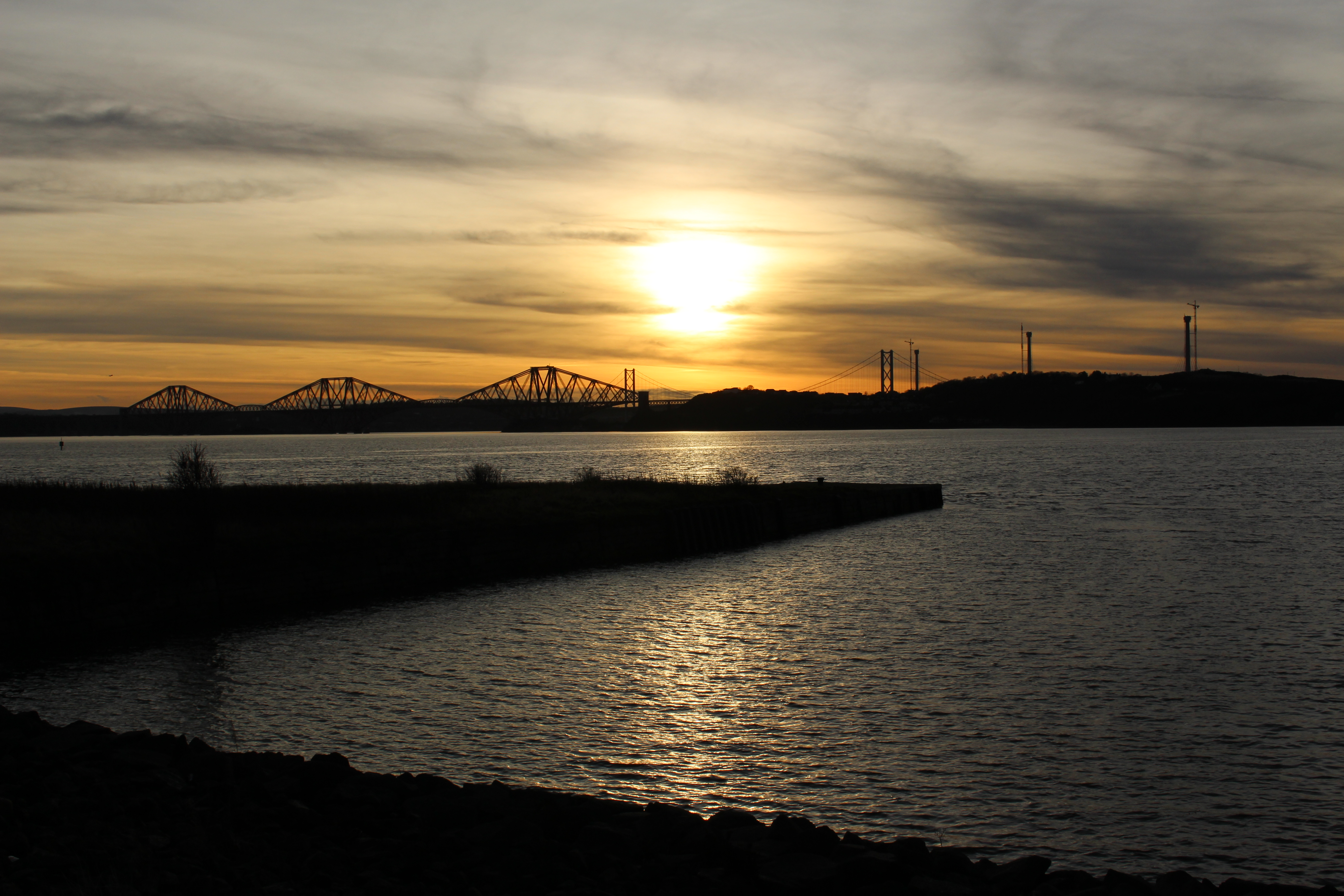
Inverkeithing Bay at sunset, with the Forth Bridge in background

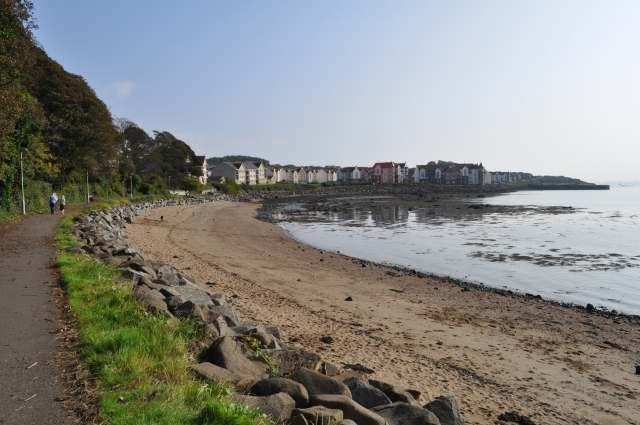
Inverkeithing Bay beach, between Inverkeithing and Dalgety Bay

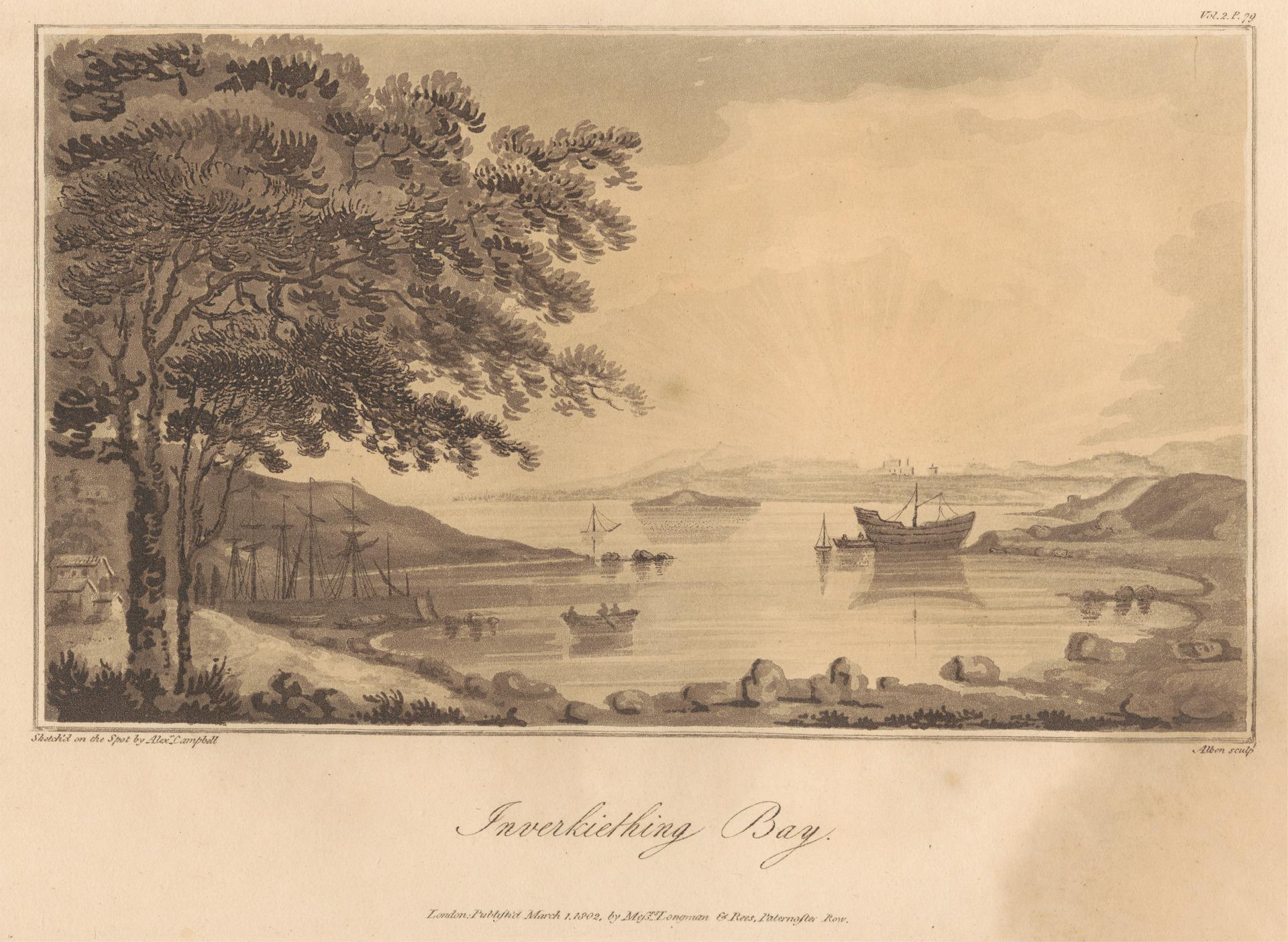
Inverkeithing Bay as drawn by Samuel Alken, March 1802.

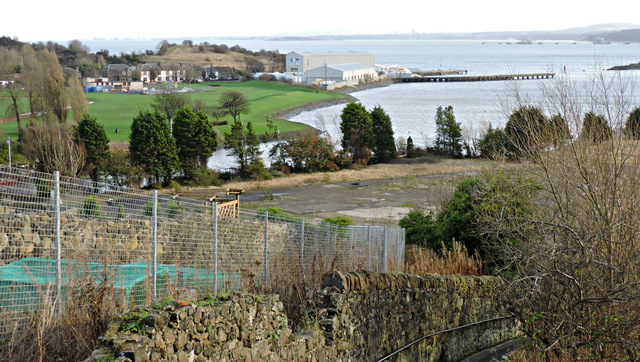
Inverkeithing Inner Bay, as viewed from Inverkeithing Friary gardens.
