= Keithing Burn =

River in Fife, Scotland

The Keithing Burn
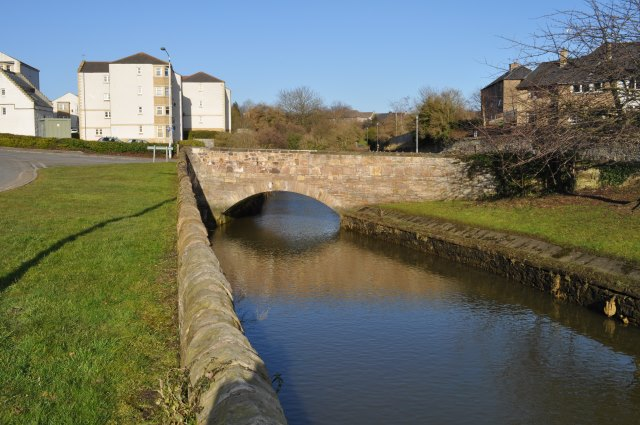
- The Keithing Burn at Inverkeithing flowing under Commercial Road Bridge.

Physical characteristics
- Mouth: Inner Bay, Inverkeithing Bay
  - coordinates: 56°01′45″N 3°23′44″W

Basin features
- Bridges: Boreland Road Bridge, Commercial Road Bridge, King Street Bridge.

The Keithing Burn is a river which flows through southwest Fife in Scotland. The river falls into the inner bay of Inverkeithing Bay, in the Firth of Forth.

== Course ==
The source of the Keithing Burn is drainage ditches in forest plantations between Dalgety Bay and Aberdour in southwest Fife. The river flows west, receiving the Fordell Burn before turning south near Inverkeithing and flowing through the town. The mouth of the Keithing Burn is the Inner Bay of Inverkeithing Bay, a bay of the Firth of Forth.

Tributaries to the Keithing Burn include the Pinkerton Burn, Mill Lade, Fordell Burn and the Brankholm Burn.

== Toponymy ==
The name Keithing likely contains the Pictish (Brythonic) "coet", meaning wood, so the Keithing burn would have meant "stream that runs through or past or issues from woodland", according to Simon Taylor (2006).

The name of the town of Inverkeithing takes the from word Keithing, and means "the mouth of the river Keithing", and is of Scottish Gaelic origin.

== Bridges ==
Within Inverkeithing, three bridges cross the Keithing Burn:

- Boreland Road Bridge, built in 1829
- King Street Bridge, built in 1815
- Commercial Road Bridge built by Sir Robert Preston in 1821.

== Industry ==
The Keithing Burn has been used for water milling possibly as far back as the 13th century. On King Street, a mill was located on the bridge. A watermill was present on the bridge until 1884.

In 1795, a whisky distillery was built by Duncan Montgomery on east bank of the Keithing Burn, and drew its water from the river. The distillery closed after 1837.

At least as early as 1587, there has been a harbour built for trade and passage at the place the Keithing Burn falls into Inverkeithing Bay. The current harbour has the Keithing Burn enter through a square bull-faced rubble sluice installed in 1840. A 20th century metal footbridge runs over the sluice.

== Photographs ==
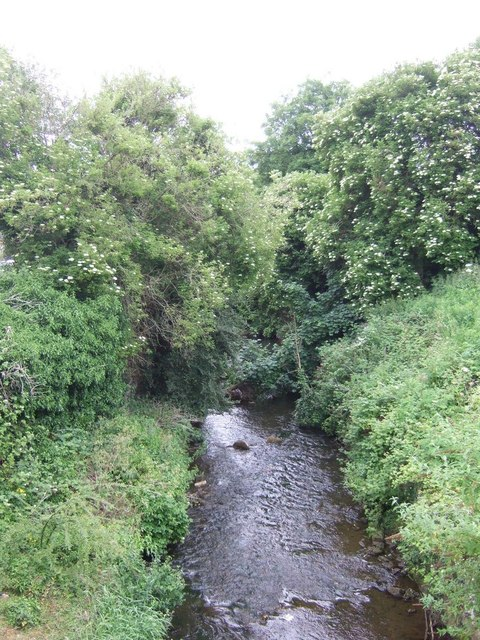
The Keithing burn upstream, southwest Fife.

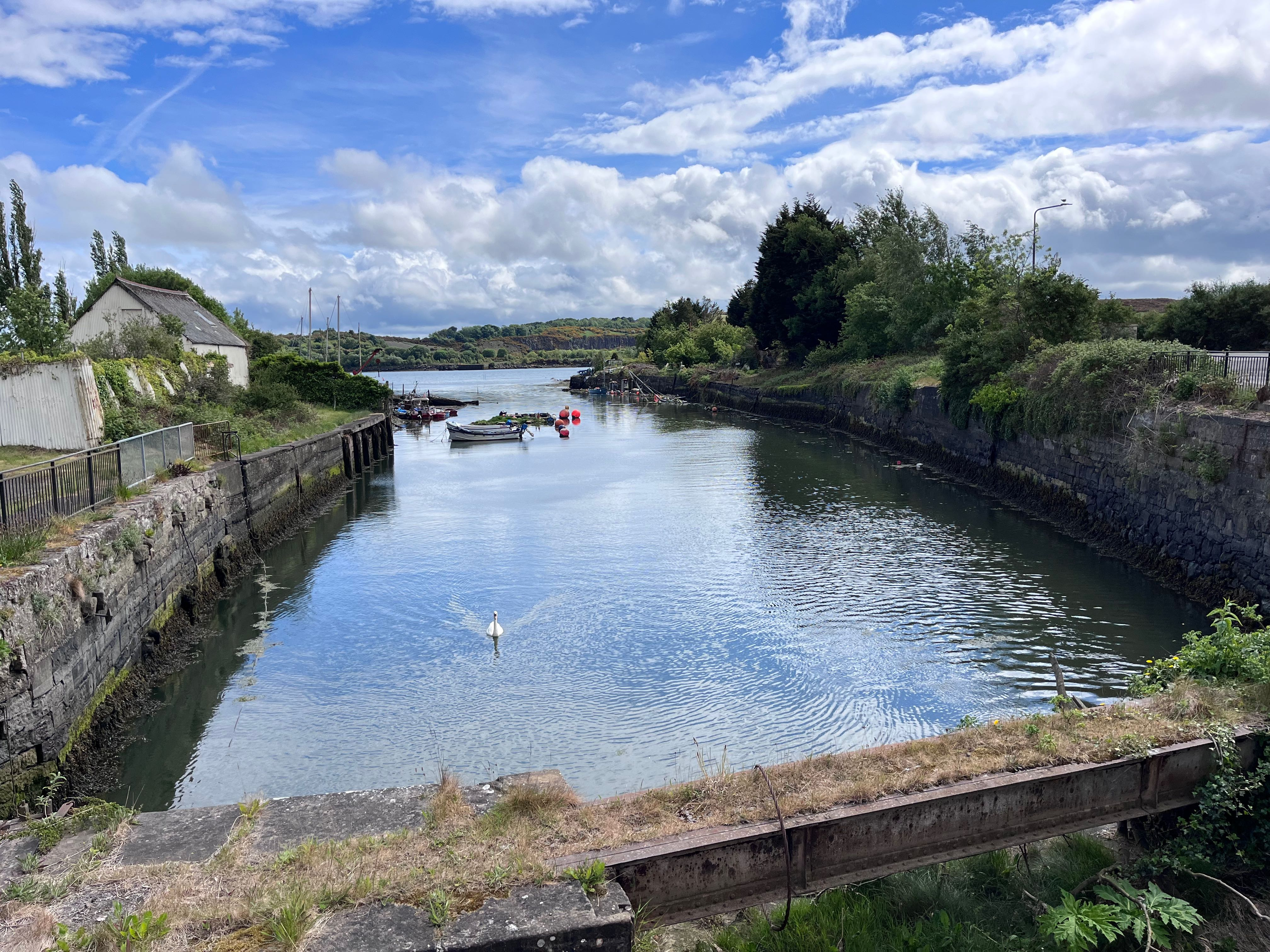
Inverkeithing Harbour and sluice, where the Keithing Burn falls into Inverkeithing Bay.

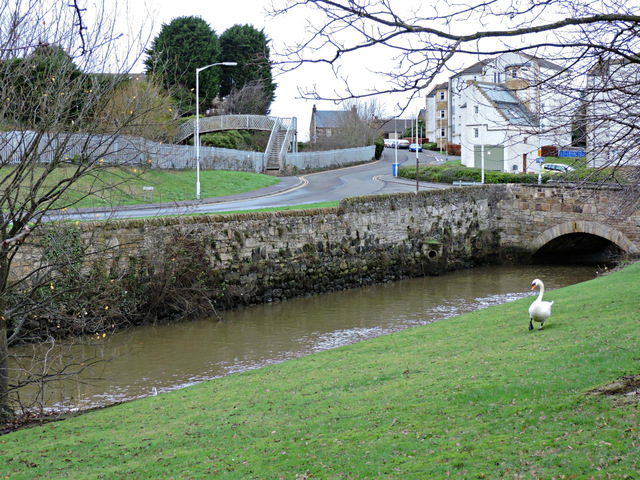
Keithing Burn and resident swan viewed from Ballast Bank Park.

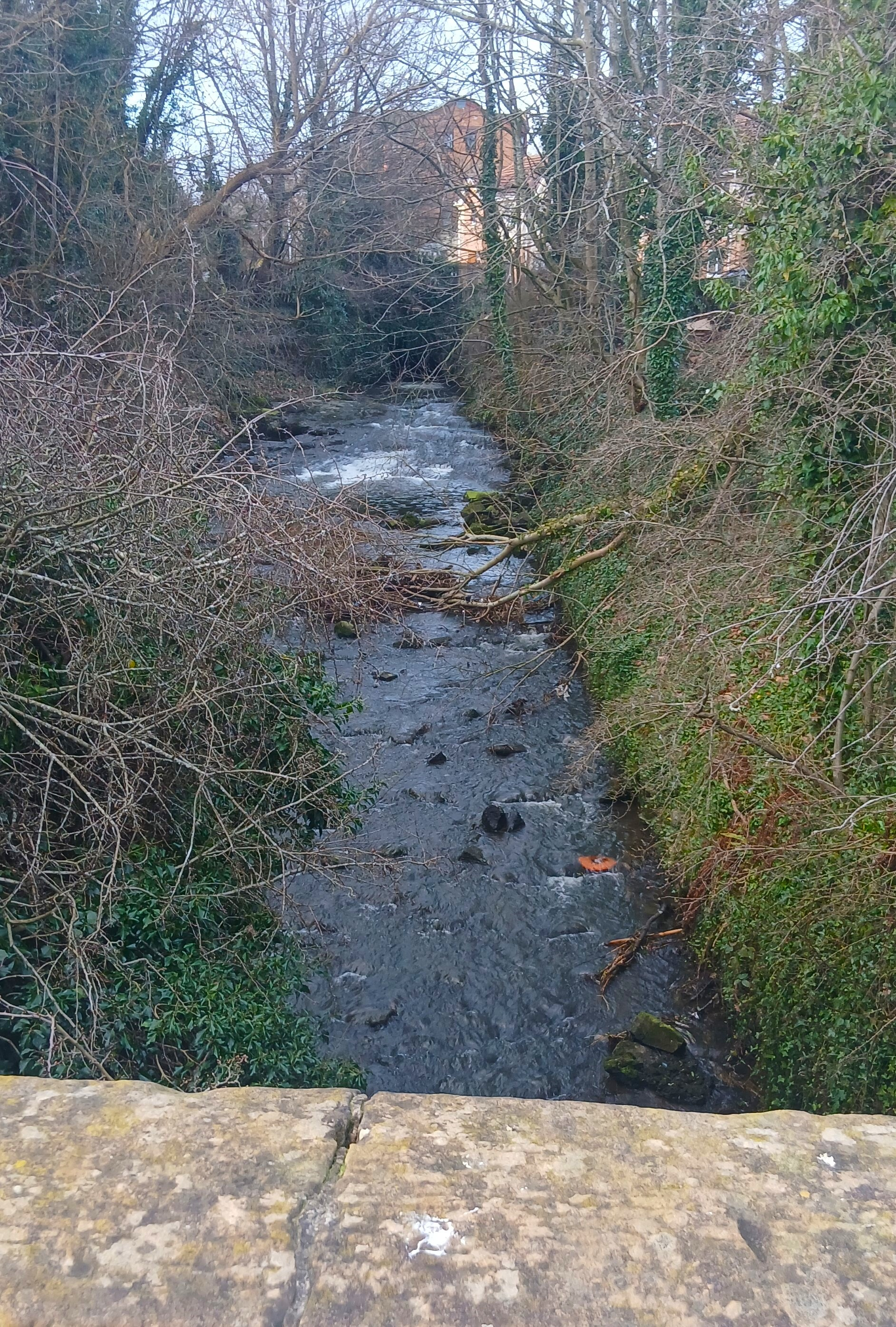
Bridge over the Keithing Burn at King Street.

Postcard of the Keithing Burn, c. 1905.
