= Fife Pilgrim Way =

Long-distance footpath in Scotland, UK

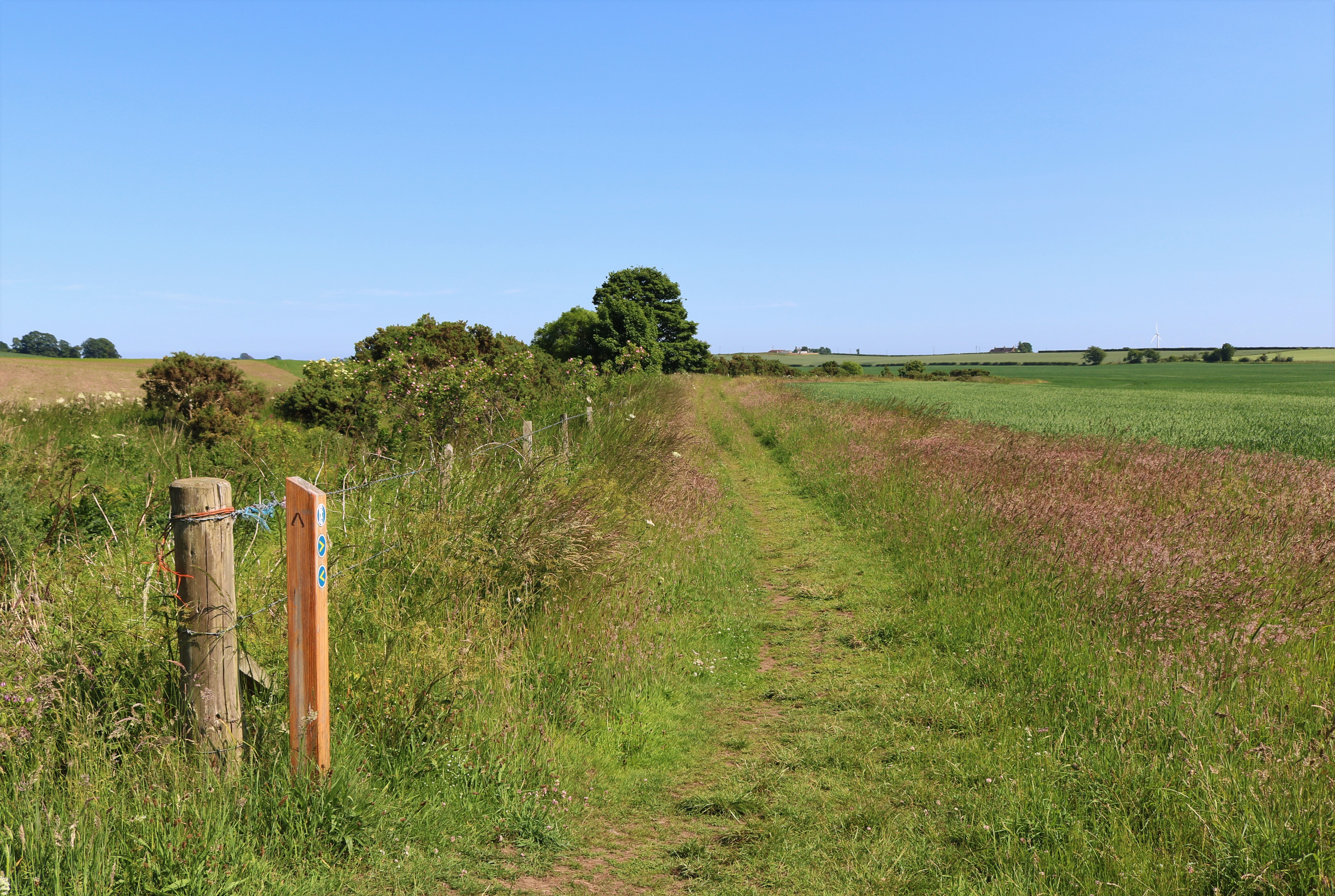
- Length: 104 km (65 mi)
- Location: Fife, Scotland
- Established: 2019
- Trailheads: Culross; 56.0554°N 3.6293°W; North Queensferry; 56.0111°N 3.3944°W; St Andrews; 56.3404°N 2.7955°W
- Use: Hiking
- Website: https://fifecoastandcountrysidetrust.co.uk/walks/fife-pilgrim-way/

The Fife Pilgrim Way is a Scottish long-distance footpath that runs inland through Fife, from Culross and North Queensferry to St Andrews. The path launched on 5 July 2019.

== Places of interest ==
The path passes places of historic and religious interest, including Inverkeithing Friary, Dunfermline Abbey and St Andrew's Cathedral.

== See also ==
- List of places in Fife
- Fife Coastal Path
- Inverkeithing Friary
