= St Margaret's Marsh =

Protected area in Fife, Scotland

- Site of Special Scientific Interest
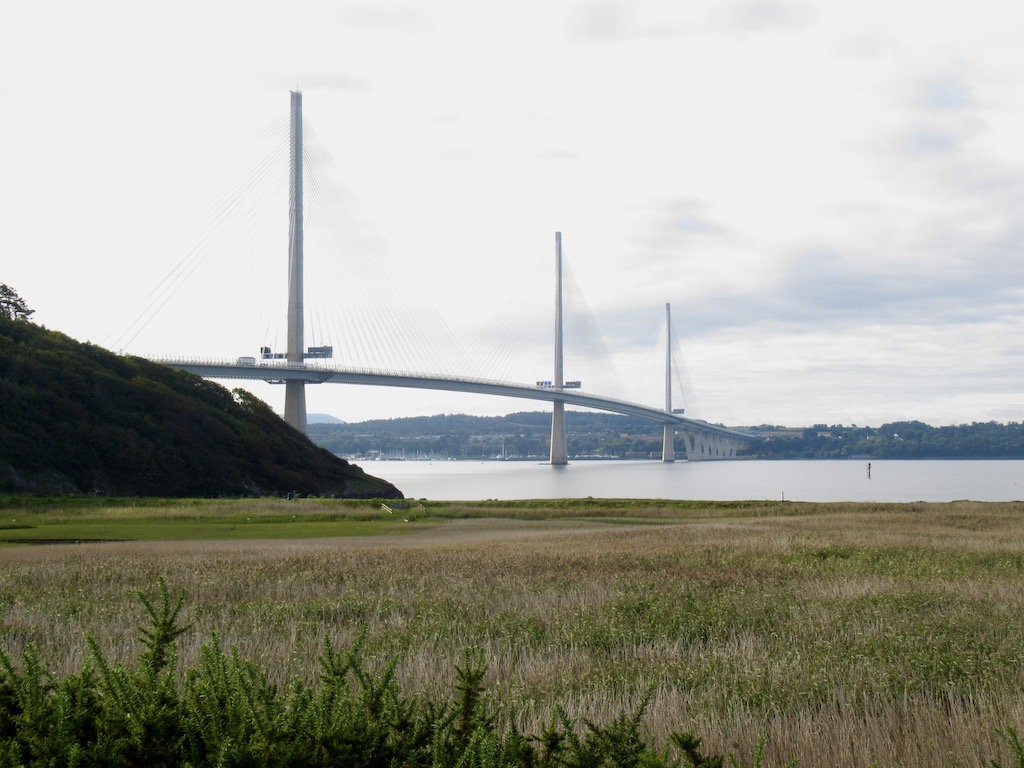
- St Margaret's Marsh looking Southeast.

- Location within Fife
- Location of St Margaret's Marsh.
- Coordinates: 56.018835°N 3.415292°W
- Interest: Habitat

St Margaret's Marsh is a Site of Special Scientific Interest (SSSI) located on the northern shore of the Firth of Forth between North Queensferry and Rosyth in Fife, Scotland .

St Margaret's Marsh is named after the historic bay it sits on, St Margaret's Hope, named from the circumstance that Saint Margaret of Scotland took refuge here during a storm to escape the Norman Conquest of England in the 11th century.

== Description ==
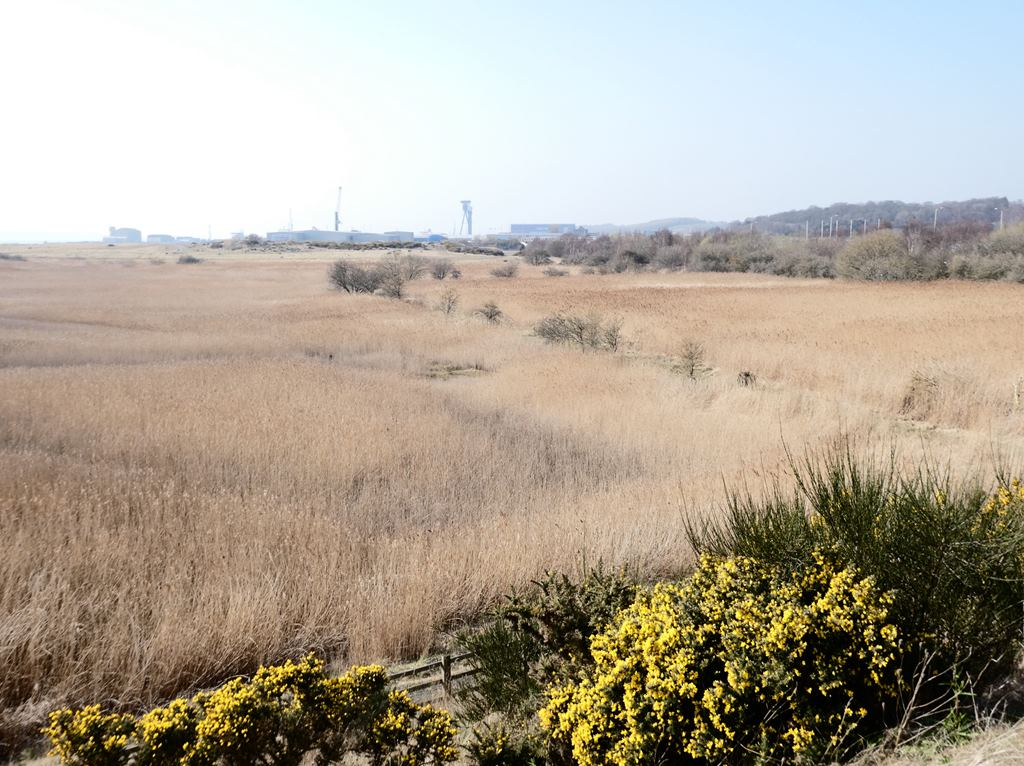
St Margaret's Marsh looking West.

St Margaret's Marsh site of special scientific interest features reedbed and transition saltmarsh situated immediately above the water mark of the Firth of Forth, which features a stone faced seawall is along its length.

13.7 hectares (34 acres) of the SSSI is reedbed. It is formed mostly of common reed and is the largest coastal reedbed in the Firth of Forth and one of the largest reedbeds in Fife.

2.25 hectares (5.6 acres) of the SSSI is saltmarsh.

A gravel path has been placed to allow bird watchers, walkers and visitors access around the SSSI.

Sedge Warbler and Reed Buntings are present in and around the marsh.
