= North Queensferry =

Coordinates: 56°00′40″N 03°23′39″W

North Queensferry: Scottish Gaelic: Port na Banrighinn a Tuath
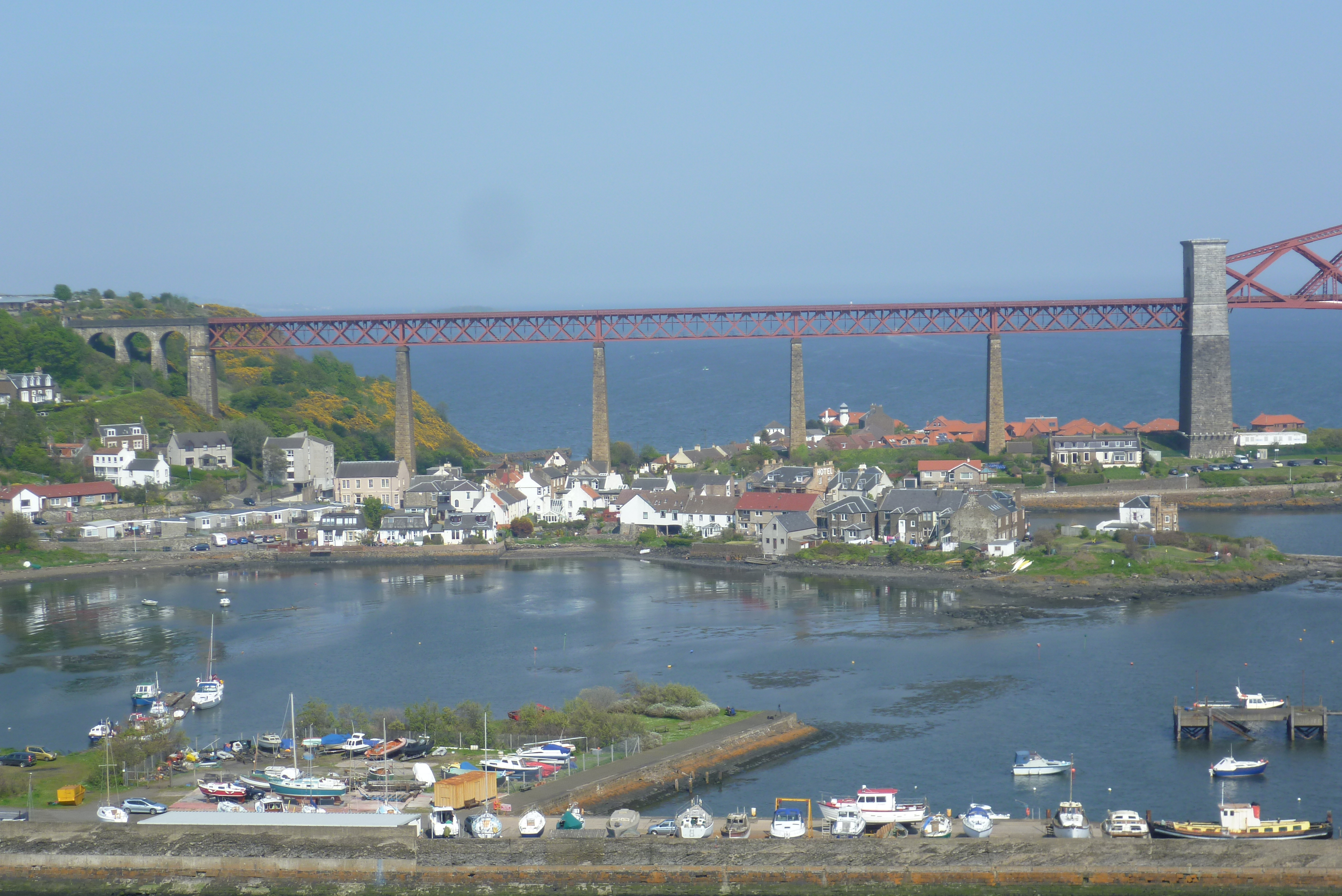
- North Queensferry from the Forth Road Bridge

- Location within Fife
- Population: 1,050 (2020)
- OS grid reference: NT130806
  - Edinburgh: 10 mi (16 km) ESE
  - London: 338 mi (546 km) SSE
- Council area: Fife
- Lieutenancy area: Fife
- Country: Scotland
- Sovereign state: United Kingdom
- Post town: INVERKEITHING
- Postcode district: KY11
- Dialling code: 01383
- Police: Scotland
- Fire: Scottish
- Ambulance: Scottish
- UK Parliament: Dunfermline and West Fife
- Scottish Parliament: Cowdenbeath

North Queensferry is a historic coastal village in Fife, Scotland, situated on the Firth of Forth, 9 mi (14 km) from Edinburgh city centre. Located on the North Queensferry Peninsula, it is the southernmost settlement in Fife.

The town derives its name from the ferry service established by Queen Margaret in the 11th century; the prefix North serves to distinguish it from South Queensferry, on the opposite shore of the Forth. The Forth Rail Bridge (1890), the Forth Road Bridge (1964) and the Queensferry Crossing (2017) all meet the Fife coast at North Queensferry. The village is a tourist destination, home to 43 listed buildings by Historic Scotland.

North Queensferry is bounded by three nature protected areas: Carlingnose Point Nature Reserve, Ferry Hills and St Margaret's Marsh. The town lies on the Fife Pilgrim Way and the Fife Coastal Path, one of Scotland's Great Trails.

The village has a population of 1,076 (2011), with a significant share working in nearby Edinburgh. Notable present and former residents include Prime Minister Gordon Brown and author Iain Banks.

== History ==
The village takes its name from Saint Margaret of Scotland, the wife of King Malcolm III of Scotland, who is said to have established the village to ensure regular ferry crossings across the Firth of Forth for the benefit of pilgrims travelling to St Andrews. Margaret is said to have made her arrival in Scotland here in 1068, and to have regularly used the ferry crossing when travelling between the then-capital Dunfermline and Edinburgh Castle. From around this time, the crossing became known as the Queen's Ferry.

Margaret died in 1093 and made her final journey by ferry to Dunfermline Abbey, where she remains buried. Her son, David I of Scotland, awarded the ferry rights to the abbey.

A settlement was likely around the present site of the village long before Margaret's time. The site of the village, on the narrowest part of the Firth of Forth, with added advantage of the island of Inchgarvie in between, suggests that it was the natural point of crossing and a vital link to the north of Scotland for centuries before the Queen's Ferry was established.

North Queensferry over the centuries remained a small community, with a population of probably no more than 600, and it never achieved the status of burgh like many of the nearby settlements. Yet the numbers passing through the village daily were huge. From noblemen to commoners, from Kings to cattle, all had to use the Queen's Ferry to cross the Forth. It is recorded that Mary, Queen of Scots, used the ferry on the day she was transported to Lochleven Castle where she was imprisoned in 1567.

In 1651, during Oliver Cromwell's campaign against Scottish royalist forces, the decisive engagement known as the Battle of Inverkeithing took place on and around the isthmus between the North Queensferry peninsula and Inverkeithing and Rosyth. The battle gave Cromwell control of Fife and the Firth of Forth. Troops of the New Model Army under Major-General John Lambert crossed the Forth from Leith over several days. They landed at Cruickness, the point to the south of Inverkeithing Inner Bay, and took up position on the Ferry Hills. On 20 July as they moved north across the isthmus they were attacked by the royalist forces under David Leslie. Fighting spread as far as Pitreavie on the far side of Inverkeithing and was said to have been particularly bloody: reputedly the Pinkerton Burn ran red with blood for days and the heaps of the dead resembled stooks in a harvest field. Lambert was victorious and claimed his men had killed 2000 and taken 1,400 prisoners, although these may be exaggerations. It is believed that the destruction of the Chapel of St James by Cromwell's men took place at this time. In the 18th century, the chapel ground became a cemetery for members of the North Queensferry Sailors' Society.

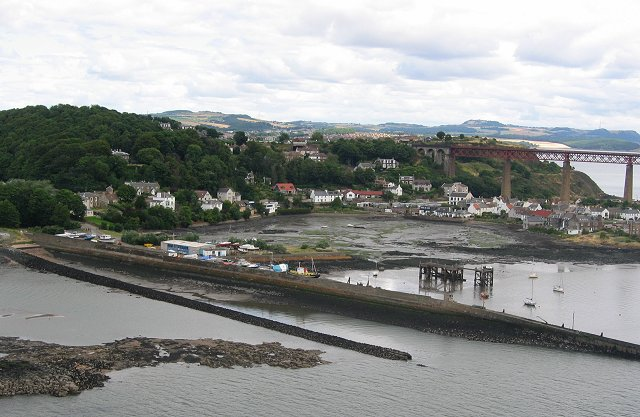
The Railway Pier, 1877

The Town Pier, the main ferry terminus for many years, was designed by John Rennie and built between 1810 and 1813. The Harbour Light Tower was erected on its current site in 1817 and was designed by Robert Stevenson- a notable Lighthouse engineer. Until this point a Signal House was used by boats as an aid to navigation. Ferries berthed both at the Town Pier and at the Battery Pier (now beneath the Forth Bridge). To accommodate the deeper draughts of the new, larger steam-powered ferries, Thomas Telford extended Town Pier in 1828 to its present length. The Railway Pier, on the far side of West Bay, was the terminus of the new Dunfermline-North Queensferry Railway which opened in 1877. The Railway Pier was used as one of the northern ferry terminals from 1877 to 1890, and in 1920 it replaced the old Town Pier.

The ferry's importance diminished during the 19th century, with an alternative ferry crossing operating for a while between Burntisland and Granton. By the 1870s there was an increasing call for a bridge to be built over the Forth. The idea of a bridge across the Forth had been debated frequently in the past, but the depth of the water and the hard whinstone rock base found underneath had discouraged any attempts. Work on a suspension bridge of a different design to the current bridge was started by Thomas Bouch in 1878 but was dropped when faith in Bouch dried up after the Tay Bridge disaster. A small Lighthouse with a base is all that remains of his design. Work on the current bridge eventually began in 1883, under the supervision of Benjamin Baker and John Fowler. The construction of the bridge altered life in North Queensferry drastically. At its peak, the construction of the bridge employed over 4,000 men.

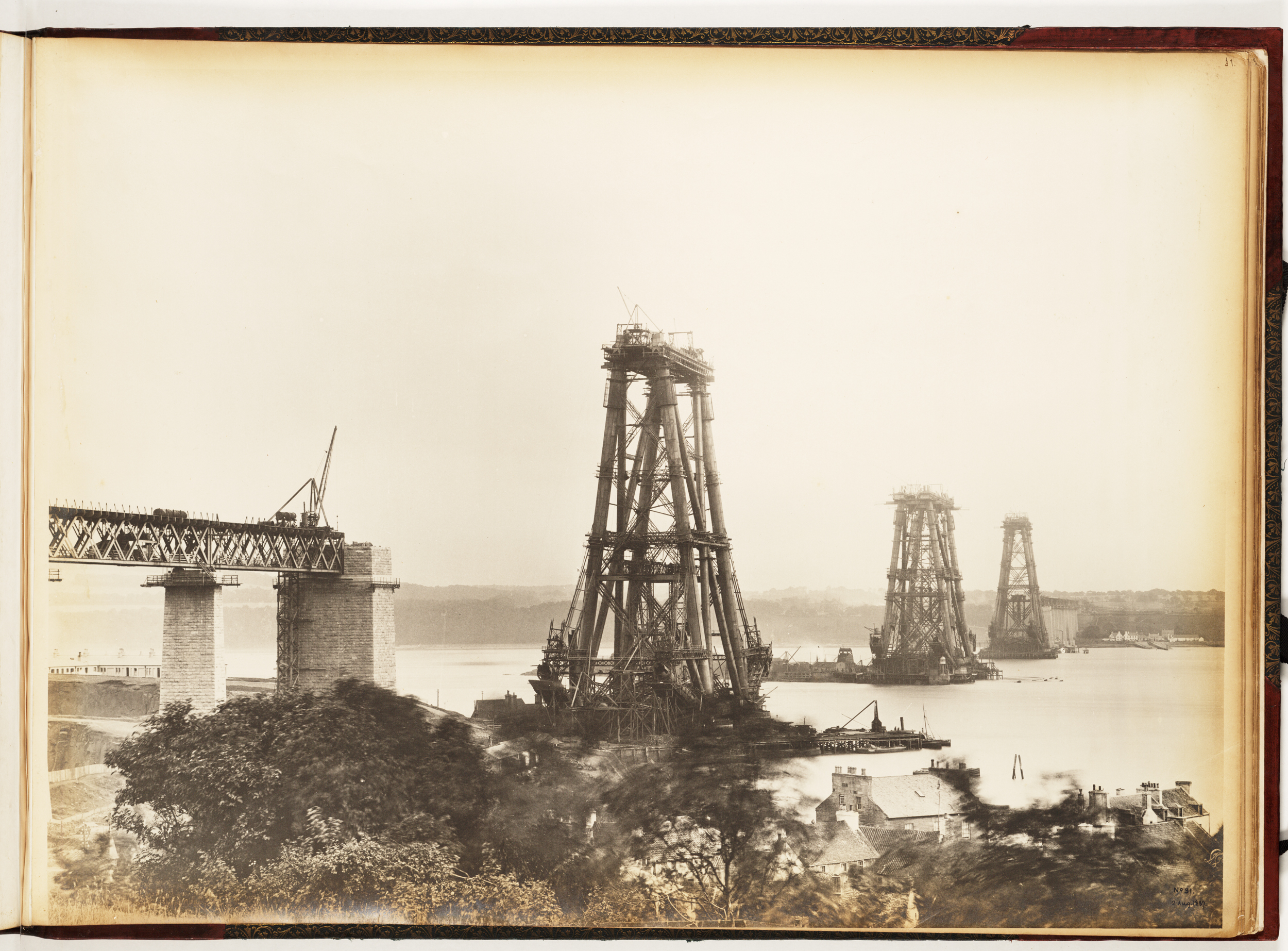
View of the construction of the Forth Bridge from North Queensferry

The Forth Bridge was opened on 4 March 1890, by the then Duke of Rothesay (later to become King Edward VII). North Queensferry railway station opened the same year.

In 1912, a seaplane base was opened in North Queensferry at Port Laing. This was closed in 1914 or 1917.

The ferry crossing continued, and with the coming of the motor vehicle in the 20th century, its importance was restored. By 1960, the Queen's Ferry was handling over two million passengers a year and over 600,000 motor vehicles. This number increased until another bridge was required. The last commercial ferry of the Queen's Ferry was the ship 'Robert the Bruce' and it left Hawes Pier, South Queensferry on the evening of 3 September 1964, and docked at North Queensferry shortly after. The very next day, Elizabeth II opened the new Forth Road Bridge, and 800 years' continual use of the Queen's Ferry were brought to a close.

== Governance ==
North Queensferry forms part of the Cowdenbeath and Kirkcaldy Westminster constituency, currently held by Melanie Ward MP for the Scottish Labour Party. For the Scottish Parliament North Queensferry forms part of the Cowdenbeath constituency which falls within the Mid Scotland and Fife electoral region. As of 2022, the constituency is represented by Annabelle Ewing of the Scottish National Party.

North Queensferry has an active Community Council.

== Landmarks ==
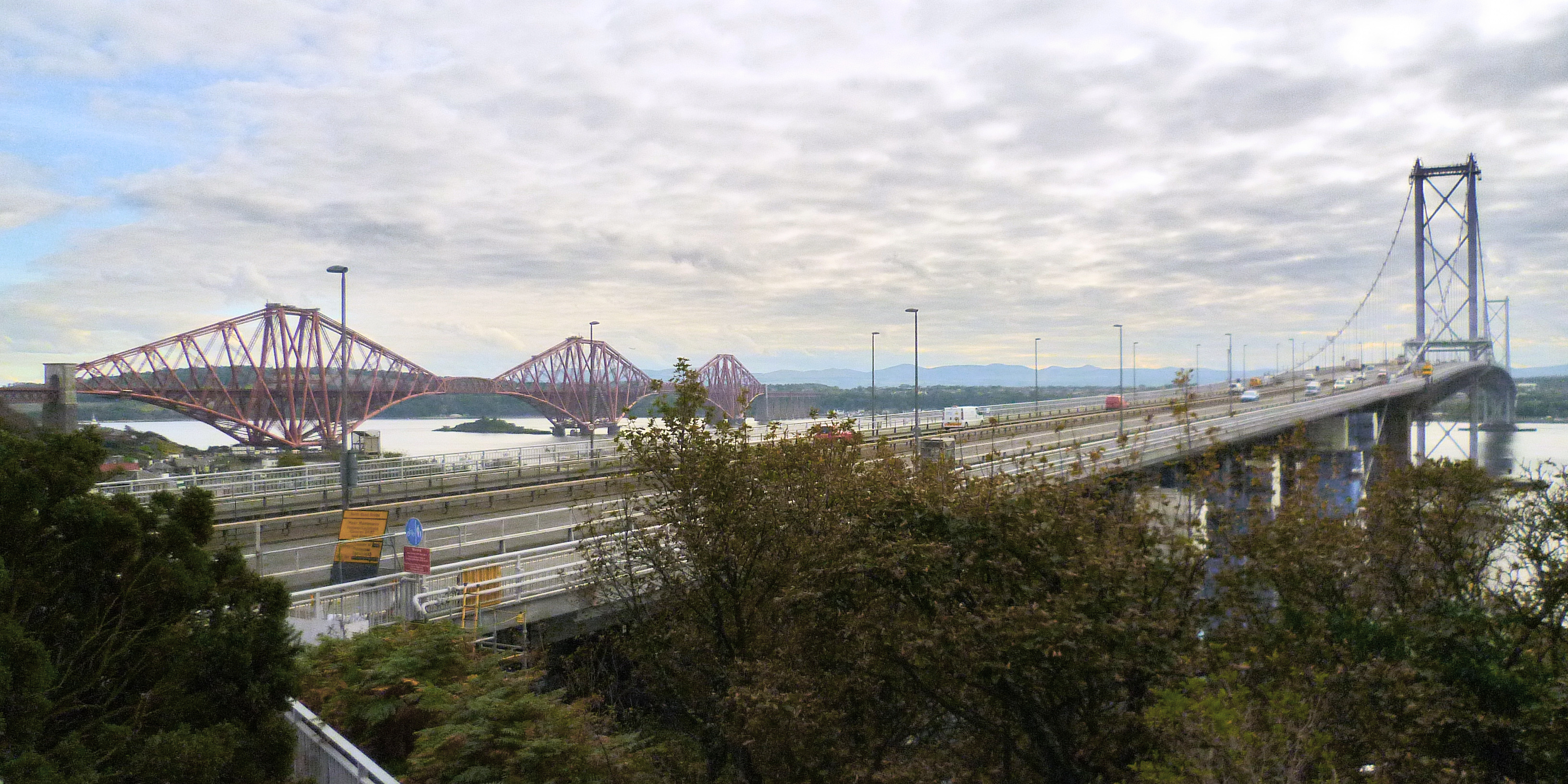
The Forth Bridges from North Queensferry

One of North Queensferry's biggest attractions, other than the extensive views it offers of the three bridges crossing the Forth, is Deep Sea World, an aquarium opened in 1993.

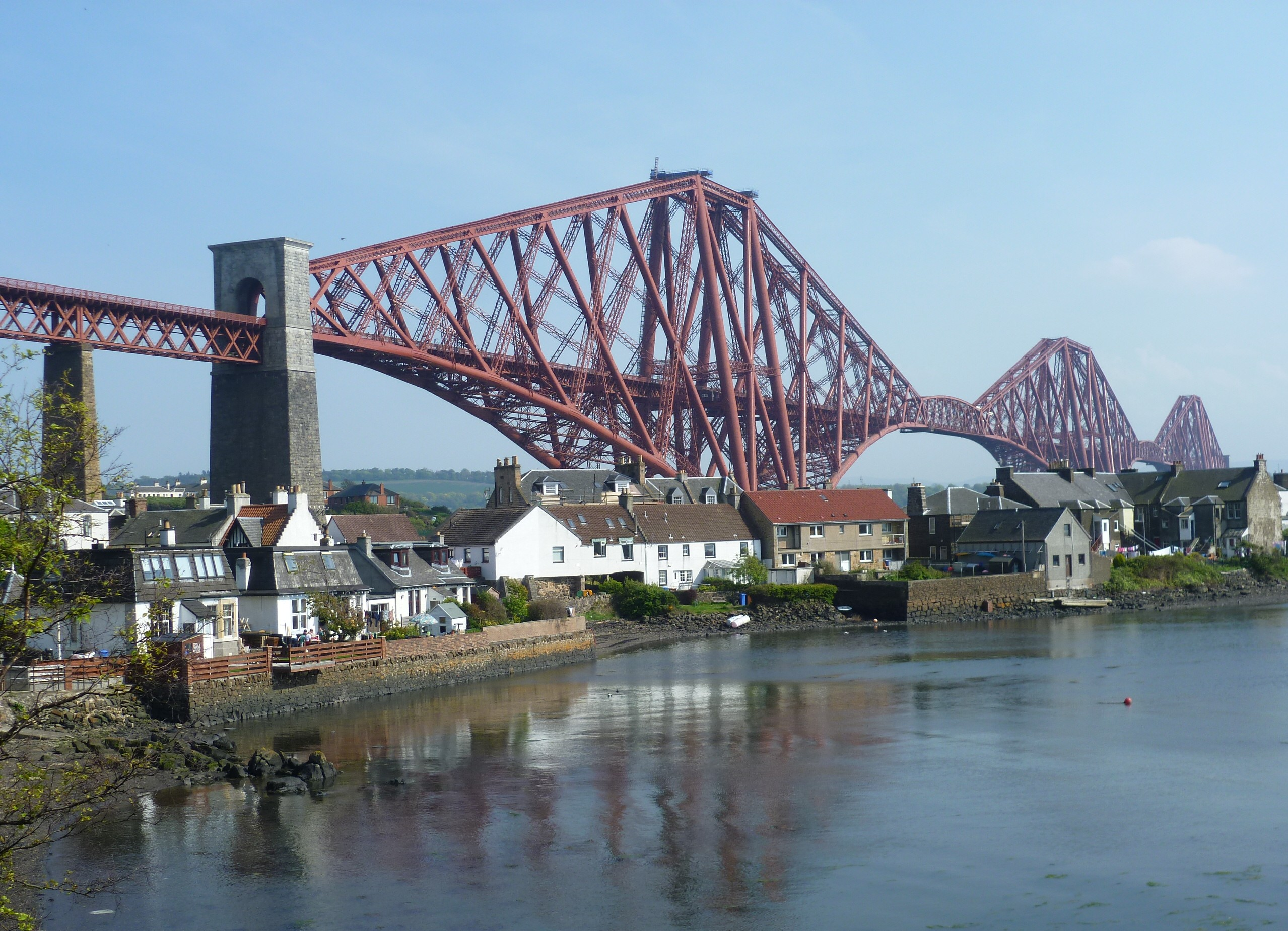
Forth Bridge, North Queensferry

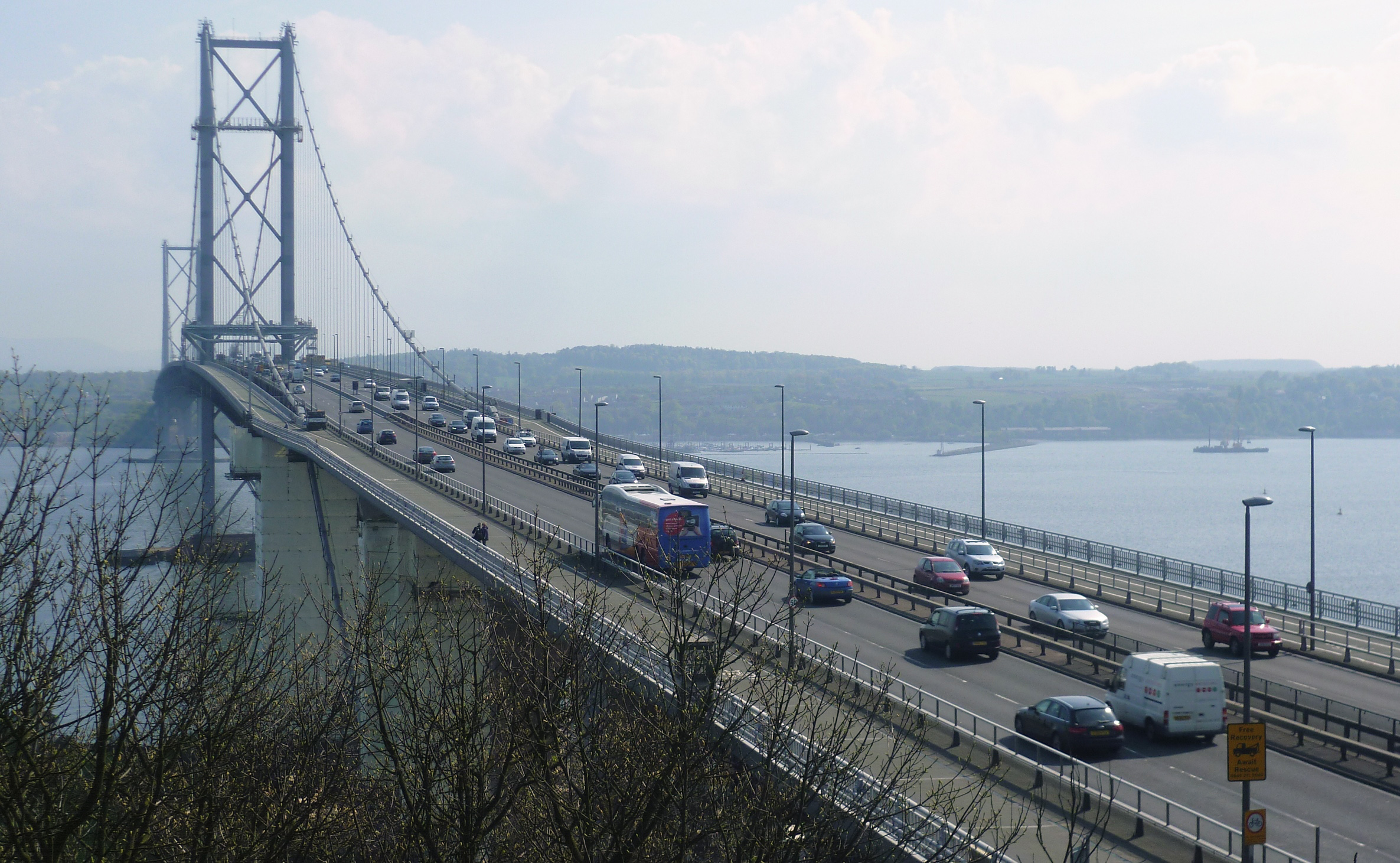
Forth Road Bridge, North Queensferry

The oldest inhabited house in the village, at one time the Black Cat Inn, is in Main Street opposite the late Georgian Albert Hotel. In the early 20th century a tunnel was found beneath the floorboards leading towards the sea. The oldest building in the village is the nearby early 14th century Chapel of St James ("the Greater" – patron saint of pilgrims) founded by Robert the Bruce around 1320–23, abandoned after the Reformation and believed to have been destroyed by Parliamentarian troops in 1651. Very little remains standing. The graveyard walls carry an inscription: THIS IS DONE BY THE SAILERS IN NORTH FERRIE 1752.

Houses in Main Street and Post Office Lane are dated 1693 and 1776; Brae House and White House, also in Main Street, are dated 1771 and 1778 and have a sundial at first floor level. On Pierhead stands the small hexagonal Light Tower, moved from its original site on the Tower House in 1817 and now restored, marking the old ferry pier.

The Waterloo Memorial in Main Street is a bell-shaped stone gable carved with an anchored ship and dated 1816. It stands in front of the Waterloo Well with its Victorian iron pump and was a watering stop for horses. There are other wells at the side of Main Street by West Sands and on The Brae. Also on The Brae are pantiled cottages with forestairs, and the Old Schoolhouse, built in 1827. At the station, a large mosaic mural completed in 1990 by local people including children from the nearby primary school marks the centenary of the opening of the rail bridge.

The Harbour Light Tower, built in 1817, standing at 23 feet (7.0 m) tall is the world's smallest working lighthouse.

== Natural environment ==
North Queensferry is bounded by three sites of special scientific interest (SSSIs): The entire shoreline of the Firth of Forth, Ferry Hills, and the Carlingnose Point Nature Reserve. The Forth shoreline is an SSSI both on account of its geology and its biological habitats, such as its mudflats which support numerous species of sea birds, many of which are to be seen and heard in and around North Queensferry. Carlingnose is designated on account of its exceptional plant life. The rare dropwort, field gentian and bloody cranesbill are all found here, along with some notable species of millipede and centipede. The reserve is also of interest because of its geology and is a good place to observe sea birds; fulmars nest on the old quarry cliffs at the north side of the reserve. Killer whales or orcas have been known to come up the Firth of Forth as far as Queensferry and have been observed from the coastal path which passes through the reserve. Port Laing is a bay and beach in North Queensferry.

== Industry ==
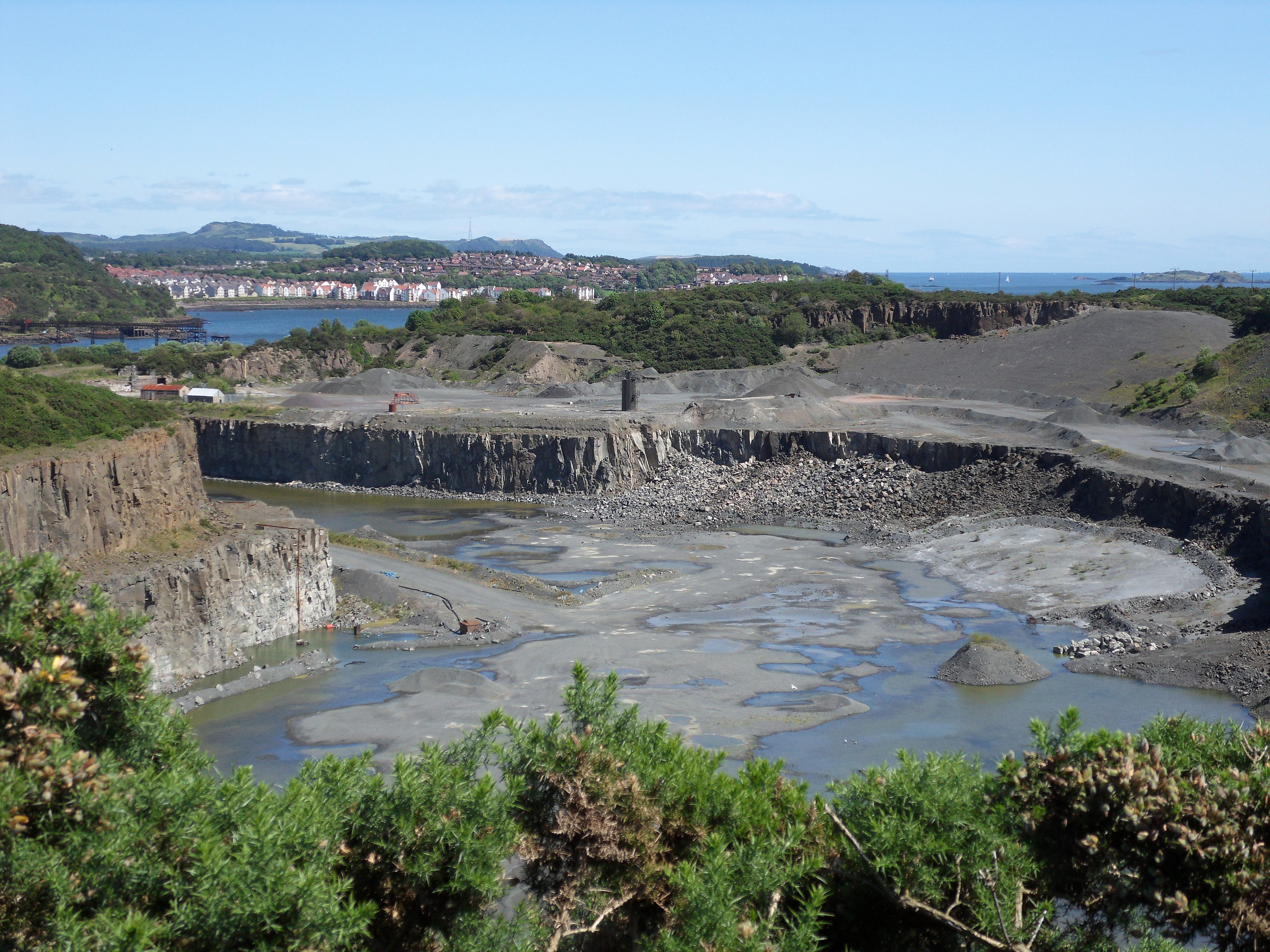
Cruick's Quarry, 1 mi (1.5 km) north of North Queensferry, in 2011, looking northeast with Dalgety Bay in the background

While transport and especially the railways and ferries have been North Queensferry's most obvious industries, one local industry that pre-dated the arrival of the railway is quarrying. In the north east of the peninsula on which North Queensferry stands there is a vast quarry, Cruicks Quarry, owned by Tarmac. The stone is whinstone, or quartz dolerite, an extremely hard igneous rock found here as a geological sill. Dates vary, but the quarry has been worked at least since the 1820s. The quarry has been non-operational since 2009, although Planning Permission was granted by Fife Council in 2012 for further working. The stone from the sill was crushed down to various sizes, most valuably the 10 to 14 mm size used for road surfacing. In earlier times stone from the quarry was used to build the docks at Leith and Liverpool as well as many of the pavements of London. Ferryhills Road, which leads out of the village towards Inverkeithing, skirts the edge of this huge quarry. A viewing platform on the west is now overgrown, but the quarry can be seen by turning right at Jamestown into Cruickness Road, then following the road round to the old weighbridge. The pool occupied by Deep Sea World is also an old whinstone quarry.

== Facilities ==
North Queensferry has three hotels, bed and breakfast establishments and holiday homes to let.

Near the station is the village primary school (a large pink sandstone category B listed Art Nouveau building dating from 1912 to 1914), a small general store and a community centre (all in Brock Street). The church, on Ferryhills Road, is twinned with Hohoe in Ghana.

North Queensferry lies on the Fife Coastal Path, and was the southern terminus for the route until it was extended west to Kincardine in 2011. The path follows the B981, continues past the Waterloo Memorial at the foot of the Brae and heads along the coast to Inverkeithing via Carlingnose Point, and then Port Laing, a cove with a sandy beach and steep wooded slopes. Due to North Queensferry's importance for medieval pilgrims, it is one of the towns along the Fife Pilgrim Way established in 2019.

== Notable people ==
- Gordon Brown, former British Prime Minister, has lived in the village since the 1990s.
- Iain Banks, the late author, was brought up in North Queensferry. After a spell living elsewhere, he returned in the early 1990s.
- Ian Jack, the late journalist and writer, grew up here.
- Alexander Stoddart Wilson, the late botanist and reverend, was ordained here in 1881.
