= Fife Coastal Path =

Great Trail in Fife, Scotland

- Fife Coastal Path signpost near Earlsferry
- Length: 187 km (116 mi)
- Location: Fife, Scotland
- Established: 2002
- Designation: Scotland's Great Trails
- Trailheads: Kincardine; 56.06623°N 3.72221°W; Newburgh; 56.34931°N 3.24905°W
- Use: Hiking
- Elevation gain/loss: 1,865 metres (6,119 ft) gain
- Season: All year
- Website: https://fifecoastandcountrysidetrust.co.uk/walks/fife-coastal-path/

The Fife Coastal Path is a Scottish long distance footpath that runs from Kincardine to Newburgh along the coastline of Fife.

The path was created in 2002, originally running from North Queensferry to Tayport. It was extended in 2011 with a new section running from Kincardine to North Queensferry, then again in 2012 from Tayport to Newburgh. The path, which usually takes between one week and 10 days to walk in full, now runs for 187 kilometres (116 mi).

The Fife Coastal Path is managed and maintained by Fife Coast and Countryside Trust, a registered environmental charity, and is designated as one of Scotland's Great Trails by NatureScot. About 500,000 people use sections of the path every year, and it has been claimed that some 35,000 walk the entire route. However, this claim is readily challenged. It would equate to nearly 100 walkers completing the route and arriving in Kincardine or Newburgh every day, all year round. Local observation suggests that the true daily figure reaching or departing Newburgh is no more than a handful, even in summer.

== Places of interest ==
Places of historic interest along the route include: Inverkeithing's Hospitum of the Grey Friars, Aberdour Castle, Macduff's Castle near East Wemyss, Wemyss Castle, and Pitmilly, a former estate associated with the Moneypenny family. On the southern bank of the River Tay between the historic rail bridge - in 1879 the scene of one of the greatest rail disasters in Britain - and the 1960s road bridge, lies the historic town of Newport. Here you will pass the ferry terminal built by Telford, and also the historic post house building (1806), which now houses the Tatha gallery, named after the Gaelic for the River Tay. Along the way a range of diverse wildlife such as porpoises, dolphins and puffins may sometimes be seen. The focal point of the Fife Coastal Path is the Harbourmaster's House, in Dysart, which was used as a location during the filming of Outlander. The building now houses a visitor centre and cafe, as well as being the head offices of the Fife Coast and Countryside Trust.

The path includes a short (c. 0.5 km) optional section known as the Elie Chain Walk, between Kincraig Point and Earlsferry to the west of Elie. This route, which should only be used during low tides, has chains fixed to the cliffs and rocks of the shore to assist progress, and is sometimes referred to as Scotland’s via ferrata. At times, short vertical climbs are necessary, although most of the chains are positioned to provide support while walking. The chains were first installed in the 1920s, and were replaced in 2010. An alternative, more straightforward route runs along the clifftop above.

Carlin Knowes quarry, at North Queensferry, has a memorial plaque commemorating the halting of the eviction of Irish families from Dunfermline in 1850. Carlin Knowes quarrymen were deputised by the Provost of Inverkeithing to protect the families who were being driven out of Fife. The hostile mob was confronted by the quarrymen and the expulsion stopped. The Irish families were then escorted back to their homes in Dunfermline.

== Running ==
On 5 October 2013, a team of 6 runners from Carnethy Hill Running Club in Edinburgh set a mark of 15 hours and 10 minutes running continuously in stages along the 187-km length, starting at Kincardine at 3am and finishing in Newburgh at 6.10pm. This mark has subsequently been ratified by the Fife Coast and Countryside Trust.

On the evening of Friday 4 September 2020, at 11.12pm, Carnethy Hill Racing Club member, Nicola Duncan, (Edinburgh based but originally from Galway, Ireland) set off from Kincardine to run the route, finishing at Newburgh 23 hours, 16 minutes, 54 seconds later on the evening of Saturday 5 September to set the FKT (Fastest Known Time) for a solo runner to complete the entire Fife Coastal Path.

== Towns and villages on the path ==
Listed from south to north (anti-clockwise):

- Kincardine
- Culross
- Valleyfield
- Torryburn
- Crombie
- Charlestown
- Limekilns
- Rosyth
- North Queensferry
- Inverkeithing
- Dalgety Bay
- Aberdour
- Burntisland
- Kinghorn
- Kirkcaldy
- Dysart
- West Wemyss
- East Wemyss
- Buckhaven
- Methil
- Leven
- Lundin Links
- Lower Largo
- Elie and Earlsferry
- St Monans
- Pittenweem
- Anstruther
- Cellardyke
- Crail
- Kingsbarns
- Boarhills
- St Andrews
- Guardbridge
- Leuchars
- Tayport
- Newport-on-Tay
- Woodhaven
- Wormit
- Balmerino
- Newburgh

== Approximate map ==
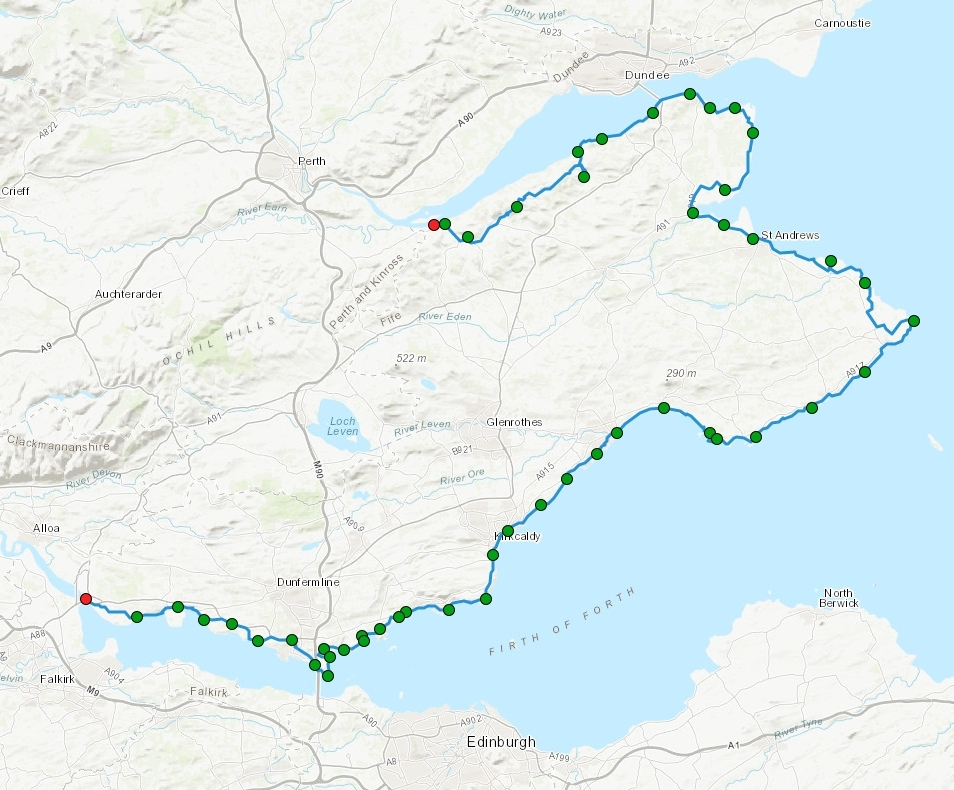

== See also ==
- Scotland's Great Trails
- Fife Pilgrim Way
- List of places in Fife
