= Harbourmaster's House, Dysart =

Harbourmaster's House
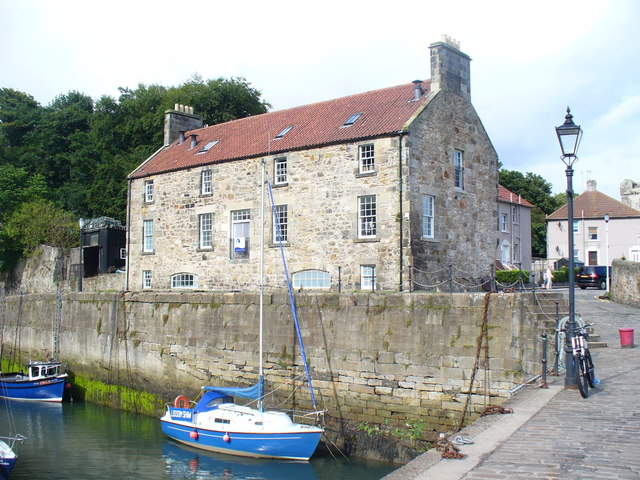
- Harbourmaster's House, Dysart
- Interactive map of Harbourmaster's House
- 56.1233°N 3.1240°W
- Location: Dysart, Fife, Scotland

Listed Building – Category B
- Official name: Dysart, Hot Pot Wynd, Harbour House
- Designated: 27 January 1971
- Reference no.: LB45507

The Harbourmaster's House is a B-listed 18th-century building located by Dysart Harbour, near Kirkcaldy in Fife, Scotland. It houses the first coastal centre in Fife, which was opened by Gordon Brown in 2006.

It is run by Fife Coast and Countryside Trust, whose headquarters are in the building.

The Harbourmaster's House and Dysart Harbour were used a filming location for season two, episode one of the TV series Outlander.
