= Wild liquorice =

Wild liquorice or wild licorice typically refers to any of three plants:

- Liquorice milk-vetch, a European species Astragalus glycyphyllos
- Small spikenard, a North American species Aralia nudicaulis
- American licorice, a North American species Glycyrrhiza lepidota
- Abrus precatorius, Asian species

and may also refer to other members of the liquorice genus Glycyrrhiza.
