= Inverkeithing Harbour =

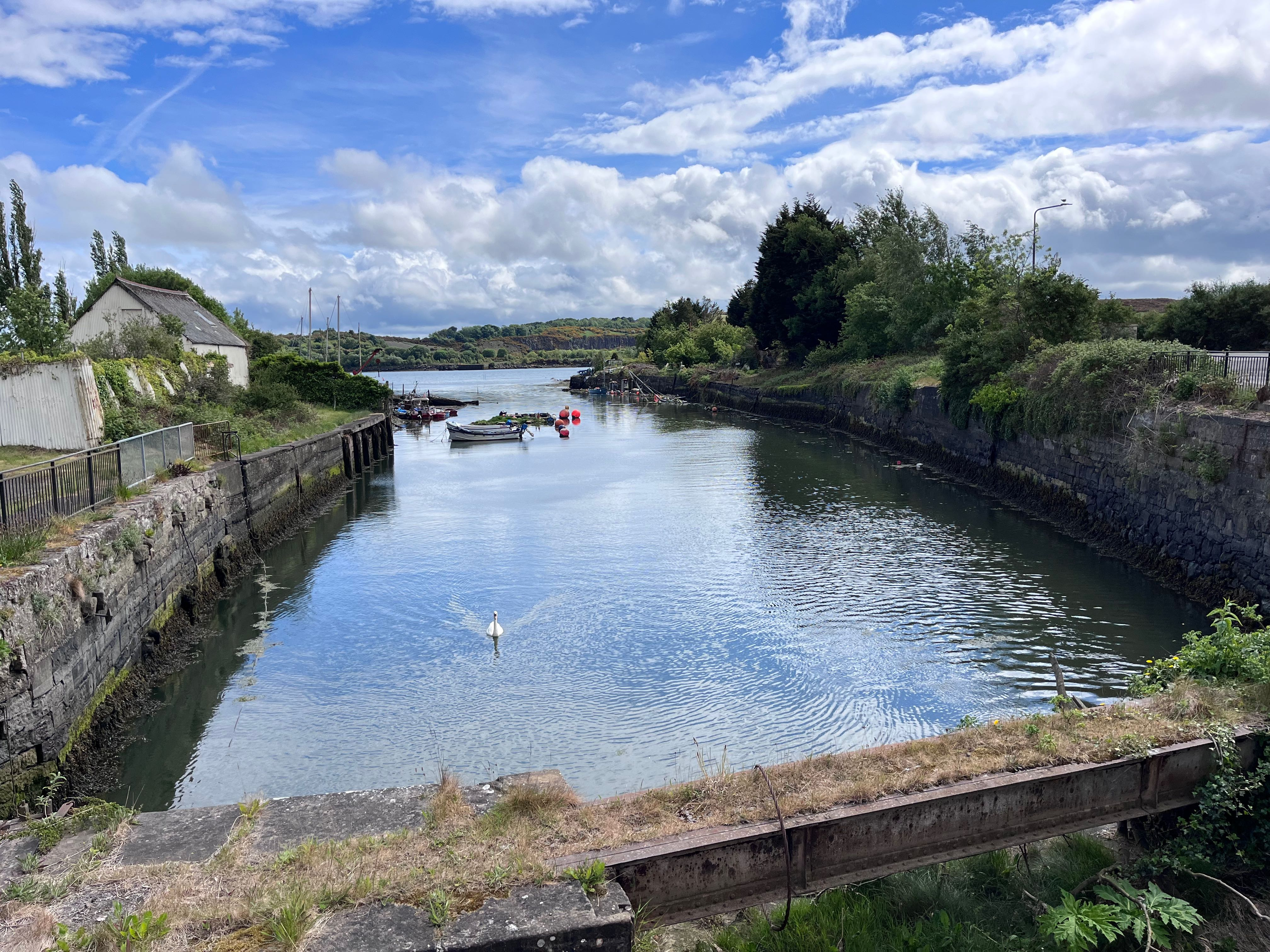
- Inverkeithing Harbour looking out towards Inverkeithing Bay.

- Location in Fife
- 56°01′47″N 3°23′54″W
- Location: Inverkeithing Harbour, Inverkeithing, UK

History
- Built: Before 1587
- Rebuilt: C. late 18th Century

Listed Building – Category B
- Official name: Category B Listed Building
- Designated: 4th August 2004
- Reference no.: LB49949

Inverkeithing Harbour is a harbour on Inverkeithing Bay, located in Inverkeithing in Fife, Scotland. Originally built before 1587, the present harbour was constructed in the late 18th century. The harbour is category B listed by Historic Scotland.

== History ==
The first records of a port at Inverkeithing date to the 14th Century; Inverkeithing was probably the landing place for the early Queensferry Passage during the 12th century.

Inverkeithing Harbour at its present location is first recorded in 1587; in 1666, there is the first mention of piers and "heads".

In 1651, military authorities, with a view to preventing the vessels of Cromwell from entering Inverkeithing Bay, blocked the entrance to the harbour by "casting great stones" and also "sinking ships and barques".

In 1703, it was recorded that "the entry to Inverkeithing Bay or Harbour is large and open... Along the Shoar below there is a large and convenient key of Stone".

The present harbour dates from the late 18th century, constructed as the terminus for the Halbeath Waggon Way - built in 1783. The Halbeath Waggon way took coal from the Halbeath Colliery to be exported via Inverkeithing harbour. Shipping peaked in the late 18th and early 19th century. As boat size and traffic increased, the harbour's relatively shallow depth became a problem, and trade from the harbour reduced after the Halbeath Colliery closed in 1850.

In 2004, Historic Environment Scotland awarded Inverkeithing Harbour Category B listed status.

== Description ==
The present harbour dates from the 18th century and early 19th century, with later alterations and repairs.

Inverkeithing harbour is a narrow rubble-built harbour, and is positioned at the North East of Inverkeithing bay - at the point where Keithing Burn empties into the bay. The Keithing Burn enters the head of harbour through a square bull-faced rubble sluice installed in 1840, with later brick repairs.

The harbour features a 20th-century metal footbridge runs running over the sluice, in place of where the Halbeath Railway formerly crossed the Keithing Burn.

The National Record of the Historic Environment (NRHE) ID for Inverkeithing Harbour is 51022.

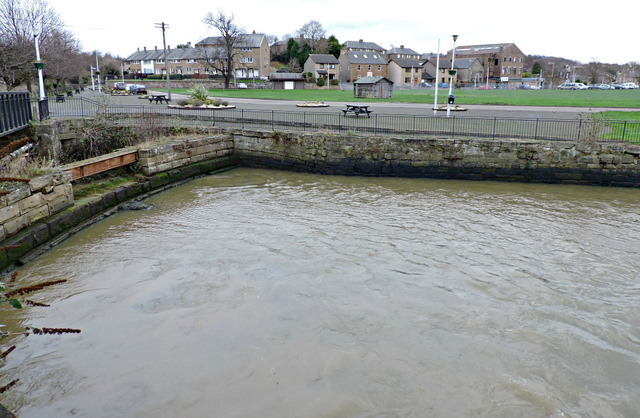
Footbridge and sluice.

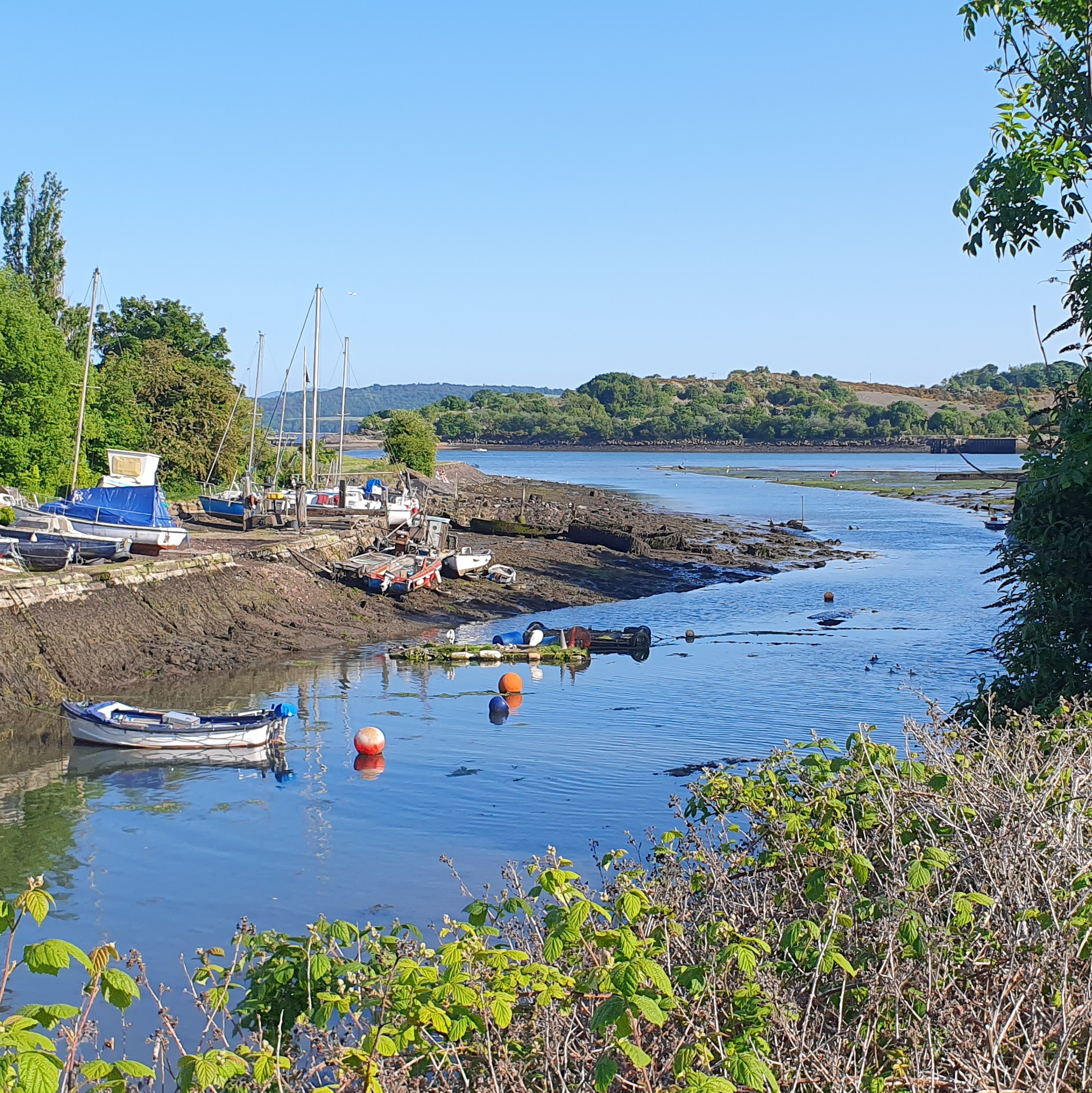
Harbour looking out towards Inverkeithing Bay

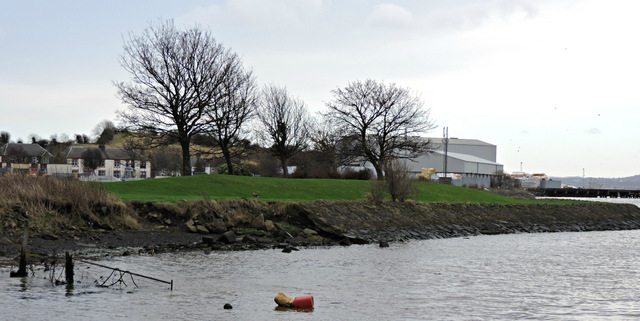
Ballast Bank Park from the harbour.

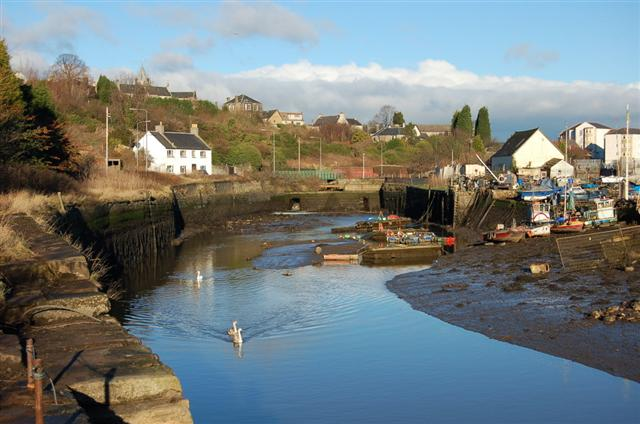
View back inland from the harbour.
