= Dropwort =

Dropwort is a common name for several plants and may refer to:

- Filipendula vulgaris, an herb in the family Rosaceae, that grows in dry meadows in Europe and Asia.
- Oenanthe, a genus of plants in the family Apiaceae, growing in moist habitats, commonly referred to as water dropworts
  - Oenanthe crocata, hemlock water dropwort, a poisonous plant native to Europe
  - Oenanthe javanica, an edible plant native to Asia
- Oxypolis, a genus of plants in the family Apiaceae, native to North America
- Tiedemannia, a genus of plants in the family Apiaceae
