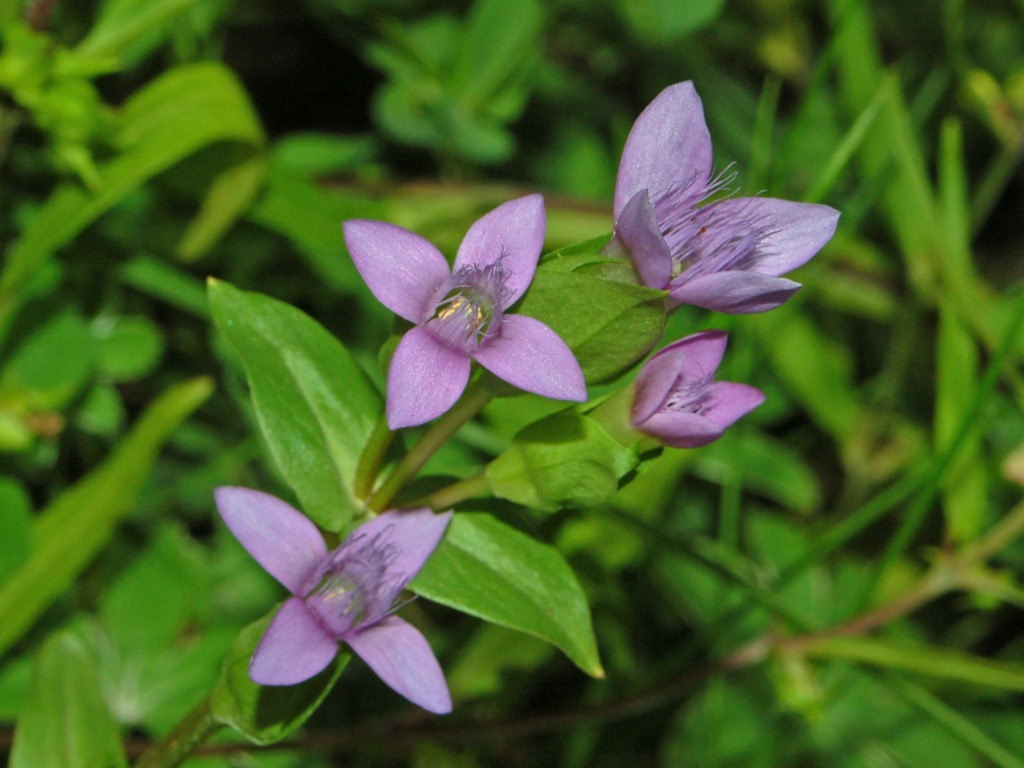

Scientific classification
- Kingdom: Plantae
- Clade: Tracheophytes
- Clade: Angiosperms
- Clade: Eudicots
- Clade: Asterids
- Order: Gentianales
- Family: Gentianaceae
- Genus: Gentianella
- Species: G. campestris

Binomial name
- Gentianella campestris (L.) Boerner

Synonyms
- Gentiana campestris L.; Gentianella baltica auct.; Gentiana baltica auct.

= Gentianella campestris =

Species of plant

Gentianella campestris, common name field gentian, is a small herbaceous biennial flowering plant in the Gentianaceae (gentian family) native to Europe. Its bluish-purple flowers contain four petals.

== Description ==
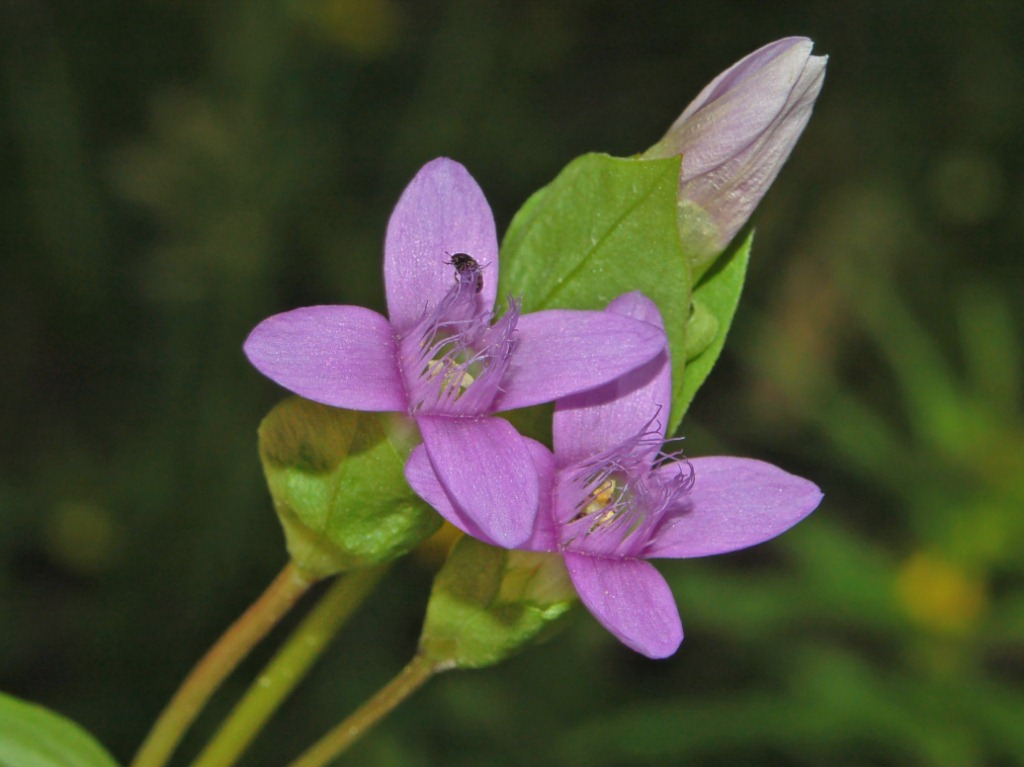
Close-up on flowers

Gentianella campestris is a biennial plant of small size, reaching on average 3–30 centimetres (1.2–11.8 in) in height. It has erect stems, simple or branched at the base and the leaves are opposite, ovate-lanceolate and unstalked. The flowers are 15–30 millimetres (0.59–1.18 in) in size. Their color is usually bluish-purple, but may be white, pink or lilac, with petals and sepals fused (gamopetalous and gamosepalous). There are four petals, ciliate at the base. There are also four sepals, which differ in size (two are wide and two narrow). The flowering period extends from June to October. The fruit is a capsule.

== Distribution ==
Field gentian is widespread in northern, central and southern Europe and its distribution range includes the European Alps and the Jura.

== Gallery ==
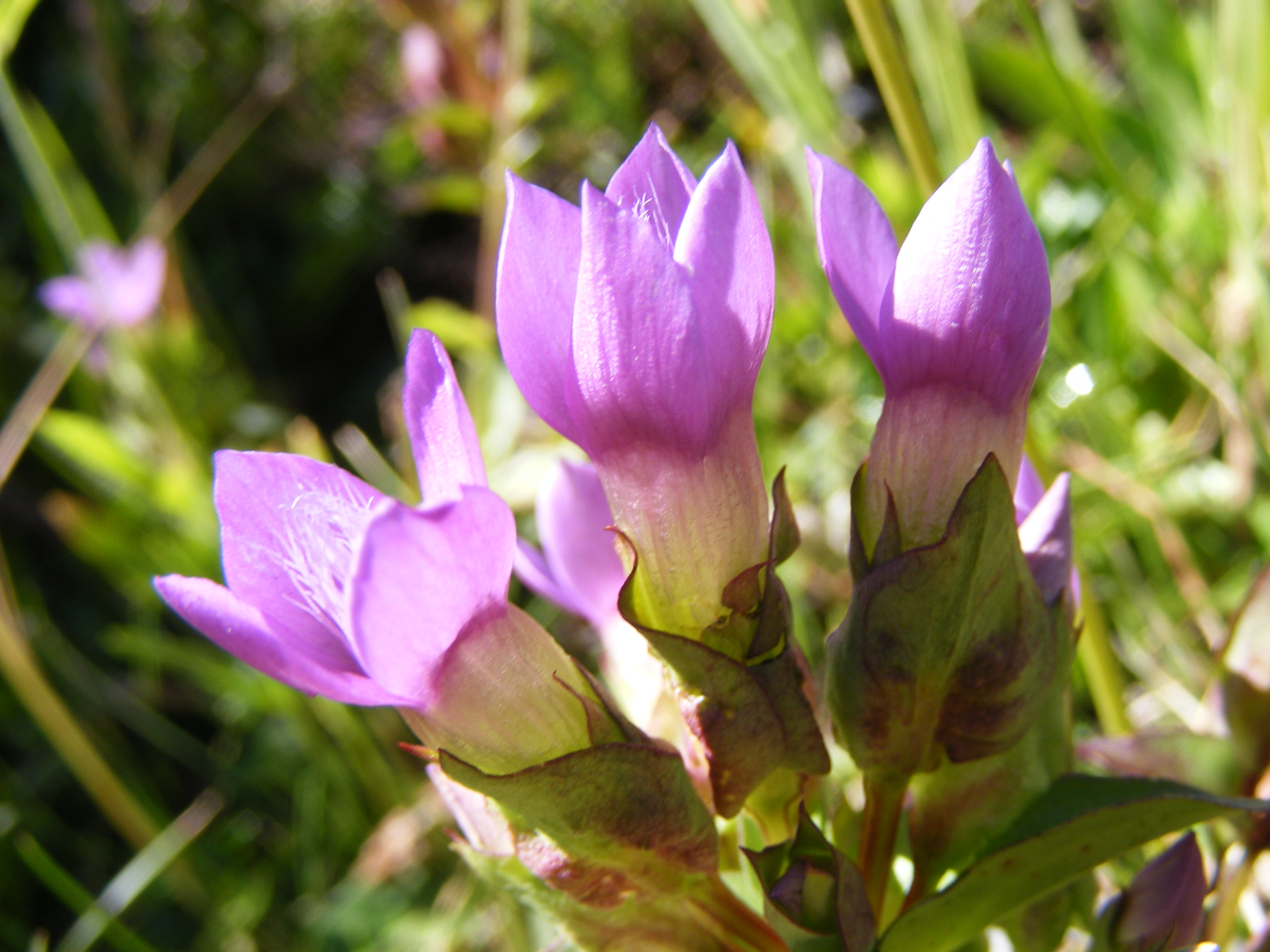
Close-up of flowers

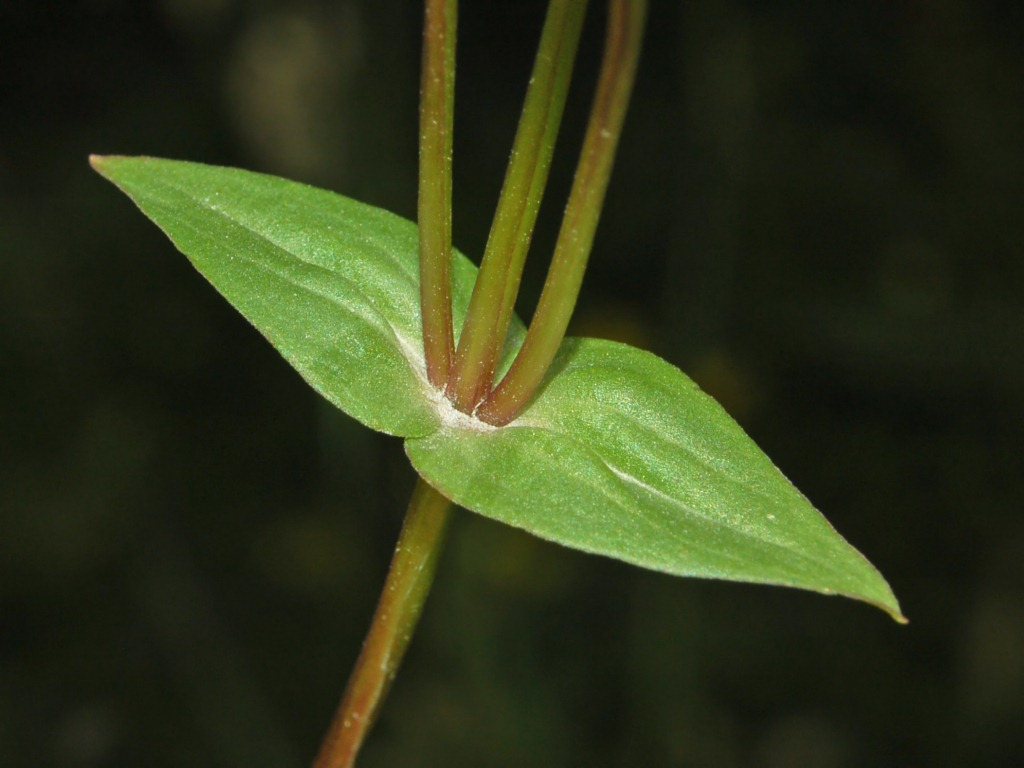
Leaves

== Habitat ==
This plant prefers moderately moist to rather dry substrates and neutral or acid soils of alpine meadows, lawns, pastures, forest clearings and roadsides, at an altitude of 1,000–2,300 metres (3,300–7,500 ft) above sea level. On the Isle of Man the species flourishes at sea level on the Ayres National Nature Reserve.

== Subspecies ==
- Gentianella campestris subsp. baltica (Murb.) Á. Löve & D. Löve
- Gentianella campestris subsp. campestris
- Gentianella campestris subsp. suecica (Froel.) Tzvelev
