= Inverkeithing Friary =

Friary in Scotland

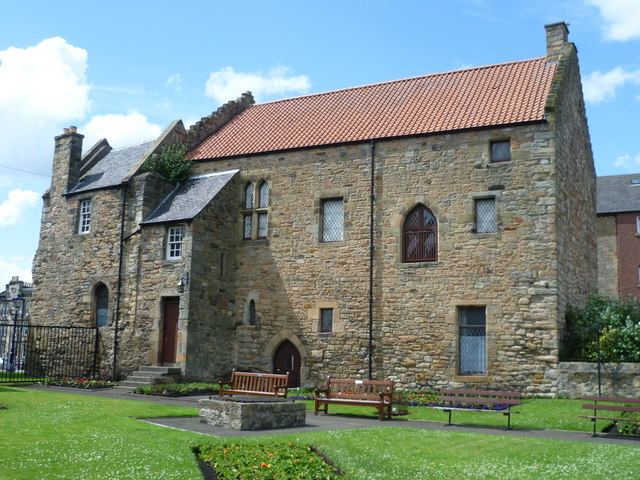
- Inverkeithing Friary from the Friary gardens.

- Shown in Fife
- 56°01′47″N 3°23′54″W
- Location: Queen Street, Inverkeithing

History
- Built: Before 1385

Listed Building – Category A
- Official name: Queen Street, The Friary including Well and Vaulted Cellars
- Designated: 11 December 1972
- Reference no.: LB35100

Inverkeithing Friary, formally known as the Hospitium of the Grey Friars, is a 14th-century friary building and gardens located Inverkeithing, Fife, Scotland.

The surviving friary building is considered to be the finest remaining example of a medieval friary building in Scotland by Fife Coast and Countryside Trust, and is Category A listed by Historic Environment Scotland.

The building features as a focal point on the Fife Pilgrim Way, a long-distance footpath commemorating the journey of medieval pilgrims through Fife. It is now used as a community centre.

== History ==
A hospital, which may have provided hospitality for pilgrims, is first recorded in Inverkeithing in 1196.

In 1329, there were six Grey Friars settlements in Scotland; Inverkeithing is not listed as one. By Papal Bull of 29 November 1346, Pope Boniface VIII gave power to David II to grant land for the site of a Grey Friars Friary far removed from the attack of enemies.

The first definite mention of Inverkeithing Friary is in 1384, from Exchequer Rolls during the reign of Robert II. At this time, the friary would have been a thriving hub for pilgrims to Dunfermline and St Andrews, comprising accommodations, cloisters, storage cellars, and a chapel.

According to tradition, Queen Anabella Drummond stayed in or around Inverkeithing Friary in the late 14th century; the friary sits on Queen street, named after this connection.

James IV made payments to Inverkeithing Friary between 1501 and 1513, and held court in the Friary in 1504. In his retinue were "moorish lassis" dancers.

Stephen (1938) lists known wardens of the Friary:

- Friar William Younger (1486 - 1487)
- Friar John Lyle (1489)
- Friar William Sinclair (1552)
- Friar Mark Flucar (at the Reformation)

On July 4, 1559, on the eve of the Scottish Reformation, the Grey Friars disponed the friary and grounds to John Swynton, burgess of Inverkeithing. Stephen (1938) argues this step was taken to preserve the property in the hope that when the reformation passed, the property could be returned to the Grey Friars. However on June 17, 1605, the crown confirmed the transaction of 1559 and conveyed the property in life-rent to Mark Swynton, Provost of Inverkeithing. The friary was remodeled into a tenement.

Subsequent owners were 'crown vassals'. In the mid 17th century, the property passed to Walter Bruce, minister of Inverkeithing. After Bruce and his wife, Jean Menzies, the property passed to Robert Menzies of Rotmell - hence the designation "Rotmell's Inn" by which the property was known.

In 1738, David Rankine acquired the property from the Crown vassal of that date, and was kept by his descendants until the Royal Burgh of Inverkeithing purchased the property back in 1932.

The friary was restored between 1932 and 1935 by Inverkeithing Town Council under Provost Fair, and was opened by Sir John Wallace, M.P., on 15 September 1935.

Since its renovation, the Friary has been used as a museum, a community hub and a centre for the elderly.

== Architecture ==
The building was originally cruciform, but only its central part remains, including several tunnel vaults formerly used for storage. The hospitium visible today once formed the west end of the friary, and it was the only building preserved during the 16th-century alterations, while the rest of the complex was used as a quarry.

An antiquarian renovation in 1932–1935 restored the 14th-century details for which there was evidence, and otherwise retained the 17th-century finishes.

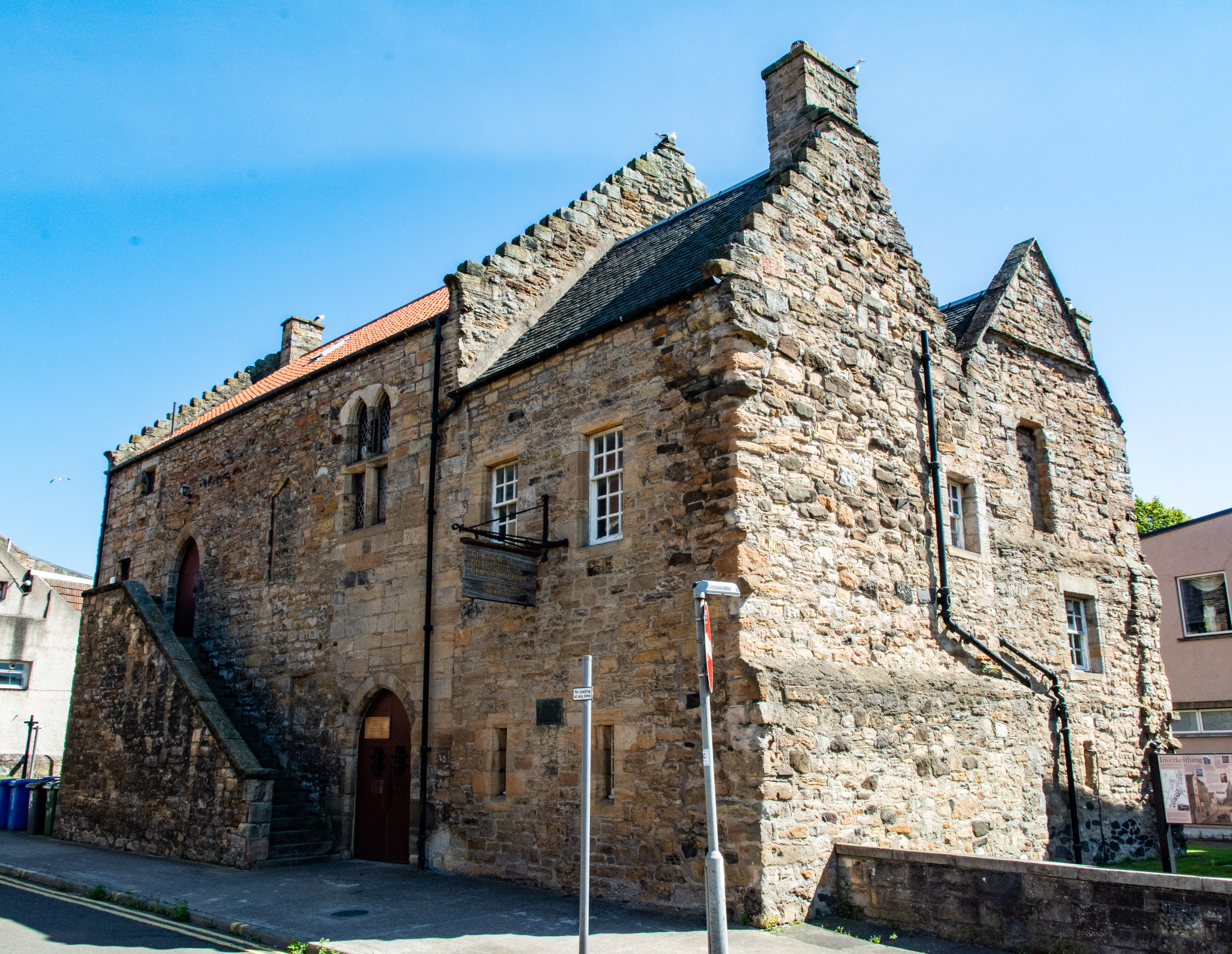
Inverkeithing Friary south aspect.

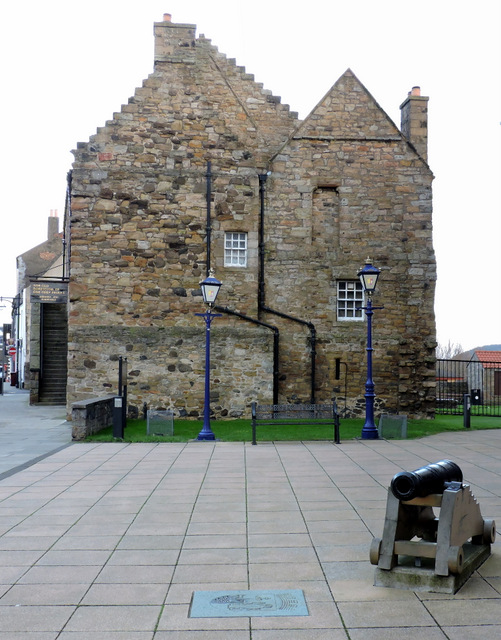
Inverkeithing Friary, south aspect.

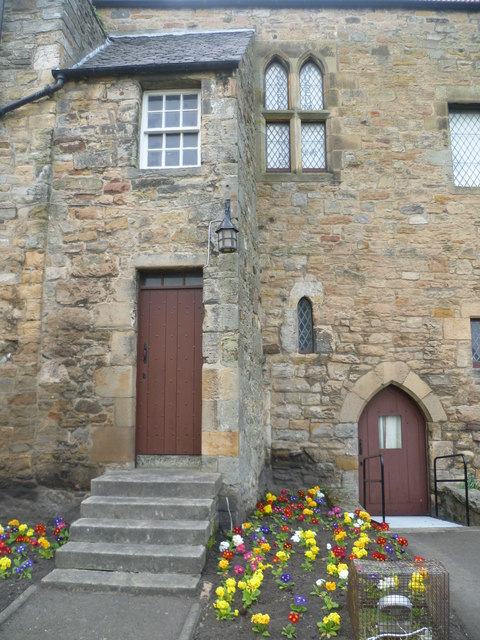
Inverkeithing friary doorways, east aspect.

Friary vaulting, used as a centre for the elderly c. 1930's.

== Gardens ==
Postcard of Inverkeithing friary gardens, c. 1930's.

During the renovation of 1932 - 1935, the enclosure of the Friary was converted into a garden and playing ground. The orchard was opened by the Earl of Elgin in September 1934. The shelter of the friary was provided by Caldwell's Paper Mill through A. Smith, managing director.

The gardens overlook the Firth of Forth The foundations of the north range of the complex, together with a well and several cellars, can be seen in the gardens, as well as a former well grated with a grille.
