= List of schools in Dunfermline =

This is a list of schools in Dunfermline, Fife, Scotland.

== Primary schools ==
Dunfermline has 15 primary schools:

- Bellyeoman Primary School
- Canmore Primary School
- Carnegie Primary School
- Commercial Primary School
- Duloch Primary School
- Lynburn Primary School
- Masterton Primary School
- McLean Primary School
- Milesmark Primary School
- Pitreavie Primary School
- Pittencrieff Primary School
- St. Leonard's Primary School
- St. Margaret's RC Primary School
- Touch Primary School
- Townhill Primary School

== Secondary schools ==
There are four high schools in Dunfermline:

- Dunfermline High School, one of the oldest and most populated high schools in Scotland, founded in 1120.
- Queen Anne High School, a large non-denominational secondary school of around 1,800. It is the fifth-largest in Scotland and serves pupils in the north of Dunfermline.
- Woodmill High School
- St. Columba's R.C. High School, one of only two Roman Catholic schools in Fife, serving West Fife. It has an expansive catchment area, stretching from Ballingry in the north to North Queensferry in the south, and Kincardine in the west to Lochgelly in the east.

== Special schools ==
Calaiswood School, located in the Duloch Schools Campus, next to Duloch Primary, and part of Duloch Schools, is a purpose-built special school offering an elaborated curriculum for pupils with additional support needs from nursery age to 18. Calaiswood replaces the former Robert Henryson and Headwell schools. There is also a Department of Special Education at Woodmill High School.

== Further education ==
- Fife College (formerly Carnegie College and Lauder College), located in the Halbeath area to the east of the town.
