= List of community council areas in Scotland =

This is a list of community council areas established in each of the council areas of Scotland.

As of 2012–3, there are 1,369 community council areas in Scotland, of which 1,129 (82%) have active community councils. There are also 3 Neighbourhood Representative Structures established in Dundee as alternatives to community councils.

Scottish community councils date from 1976, when they were established by district council and islands council schemes created under the Local Government (Scotland) Act 1973. The same act had established a two-tier system of local government in Scotland consisting of regional and district councils, except for the islands councils, which were created as unitary local authorities. The Local Government etc (Scotland) Act 1994 abolished regional and district councils and transferred responsibility for community council schemes to new unitary councils created by the same act.

== Aberdeen City ==
As of 2024, there are 30 community council areas in the council area, 29 of which have community councils operating.

1. Ashgrove and Stockethill
2. Ashley and Broomhill
3. Braeside and Mannofield
4. Bridge of Don
5. Bucksburn and Newhills
6. Castlehill and Pittodrie
7. City Centre
8. Cove and Altens
9. Craigiebuckler and Seafield
10. Culter
11. Cults, Bieldside and Milltimber
12. Danestone and Persley
13. Dyce and Stoneywood
14. Ferryhill and Ruthrieston
15. Froghall, Powis and Sunnybank
16. Garthdee
17. George Street
18. Kincorth and Leggart
19. Kingswells
20. Mastrick, Sheddocksley and Summerhill
21. Nigg
22. Northfield
23. Old Aberdeen
24. Queens Cross and Harlaw
25. Rosemount and Mile End
26. Seaton and Linksfield
27. Tillydrone
28. Torry
29. Woodend – not established
30. Woodside and Hilton

== Aberdeenshire ==
As of July 2012, there are 73 community council areas in the council area. Those marked with asterisks have active community councils. Each of the areas under the council's decentralisation scheme is divided into community council areas as follows:

=== Banff and Buchan ===
1. Aberchirder and Marnoch
2. Aberdour and Tyrie
3. Alvah and Forglen
4. Banff and Macduff*
5. Cornhill-Ordiquhill
6. Fordyce, Sandend and District*
7. Fraserburgh*
8. Invercairn
9. King Edward-Gamrie*
10. Portsoy and District
11. Rathen*
12. Rosehearty*
13. Sandhaven and Pitullie
14. Whitehills and District*

=== Buchan ===
1. Boddam and District*
2. Buchan East*
3. Cruden*
4. Deer*
5. Longside and District*
6. Mintlaw and District*
7. New Pitsligo*
8. Peterhead*
9. Strichen and District*

=== Formartine ===
1. Auchterless and Inverkeithny*
2. Belhelvie*
3. Ellon*
4. Foveran*
5. Fyvie/Rothienorman/Monquhitter*
6. Meldrum and Bourtie*
7. Methlick*
8. Slains and Collieston*
9. Tarves*
10. Turriff*
11. Udny*
12. Ythan*

=== Garioch ===
1. Bennachie
2. Cluny, Midmar and Monymusk
3. Echt and Skene
4. Fintray and Kinellar*
5. Inverurie*
6. Kemnay*
7. Kintore and District*
8. Newmachar*
9. Westhill and Elrick*

=== Kincardine and Mearns ===
1. Arbuthnott*
2. Benholm and Johnshaven*
3. Catterline, Kinneff and Dunnottar*
4. Crathes, Drumoak and Durris*
5. Gourdon*
6. Mearns*
7. Newtonhill, Muchalls and Cammachmore*
8. North Kincardine Rural*
9. Portlethen and District
10. Royal Burgh of Inverbervie*
11. St Cyrus*
12. Stonehaven and District*

=== Marr ===
1. Ballater and Crathie*
2. Ballogie and Birse*
3. Banchory*
4. Braemar*
5. Cluny, Midmar and Monymusk
6. Crathes, Drumoak and Durris*
7. Cromar*
8. Donside
9. Feughdee West*
10. Finzean*
11. Huntly*
12. Lumphanan*
13. Mid-Deeside*
14. Strathbogie*
15. Tap o' Noth*
16. Torphins*

== Angus ==
As of July 2012, there are 25 community council areas in the council area. Those marked with asterisks have active community councils.

1. Aberlemno
2. Auchterhouse
3. Carnoustie
4. City of Brechin & District
5. Ferryden & Craig
6. Friockheim
7. Glamis
8. Hillside, Dun & Logie Pert
9. Inverarity
10. Inveresk
11. Kirriemuir
12. Kirriemuir Landward East
13. Kirriemuir Landward West
14. Letham & District
15. Lunanhead & District
16. Monifieth
17. Monikie & Newbigging
18. Montrose
19. Muirhead, Birkhill and Liff
20. Murroes & Wellbank
21. Newtyle & Eassie
22. Royal Burgh of Arbroath
23. Royal Burgh of Forfar
24. Strathmartine
25. Tealing

== Argyll and Bute ==
As of July 2012, there are 56 community council areas in the council area. Those marked with an asterisk have active community councils. The communities are listed by the areas under the council's decentralisation scheme.

=== Bute and Cowal ===
1. Ardentinny*
2. Bute*
3. Cairndow*
4. Colintraive and Glendaruel*
5. Dunoon*
6. Hunter's Quay*
7. Kilfinan*
8. Kilmun*
9. Lochgoil*
10. Sandbank*
11. South Cowal*
12. Strachur*

=== Helensburgh and Lomond ===
1. Arrochar and Tarbet*
2. Cardross*
3. Cove and Kilcreggan*
4. Garelochhead*
5. Helensburgh*
6. Luss and Arden*
7. Rhu and Shandon*
8. Rosneath and Clynder*

=== Mid Argyll, Kintyre and Islay ===
1. Ardrishaig*
2. Campbeltown*
3. Colonsay*
4. Craignish*
5. Dunadd*
6. East Kintyre*
7. Furnace*
8. Gigha*
9. Inveraray*
10. Islay*
11. Jura*
12. Lochgilphead*
13. North Knapdale
14. South Knapdale*
15. Southend*
16. Tarbert and Skipness*
17. The Laggan*
18. West Kintyre*
19. West Lochfyne*

=== Oban, Lorn and the Isles ===
1. Appin*
2. Ardchattan*
3. Avich and Kilchrenan*
4. Coll*
5. Connel*
6. Dunbeg*
7. Glenorchy and Innishail*
8. Iona*
9. Kilmore*
10. Kilninver and Kilmelford*
11. Lismore*
12. Luing*
13. Mull*
14. Oban*
15. Seil & Easdale*
16. Taynuilt*
17. Tiree

== Clackmannanshire ==
As of July 2012, there are 9 community council areas in the council area. Those marked with asterisks have active community councils.

1. Alloa*
2. Alva*
3. Clackmannan*
4. Dollar*
5. Menstrie*
6. Muckhart*
7. Sauchie & Fishcross*
8. Tillicoultry, Coalsnaughton & Devonside*
9. Tullibody, Cambus and Glenochil*

== Dumfries and Galloway ==
As of July 2012, there are 107 community council areas in the council area. Those marked with asterisks have active community councils.

=== Annandale and Eskdale ===
1. Brydekirk & District
2. Canonbie & District*
3. Cummertrees & Cummertrees West*
4. Dalton & Carrutherstown*
5. Eastriggs, Dornock & Creca
6. Eskdalemuir*
7. Gretna & Rigg*
8. Hoddom & Ecclefechan*
9. Johnstone
10. Kirkmichael*
11. Kirkpatrick Fleming & District*
12. Kirkpatrick Juxta*
13. Kirtle & Eaglesfield*
14. Langholm, Ewes & Westerkirk*
15. Lockerbie & District*
16. Middlebie & Waterbeck*
17. Moffat & District*
18. Mouswald*
19. North Milk*
20. Royal Burgh of Annan*
21. Royal Burgh of Lochmaben & District*
22. Royal Four Towns*
23. Ruthwell & Clarencefield*
24. Springfield & Gretna Green*
25. Templand & District*
26. Wamphray*

=== Nithsdale ===
==== Dumfries and Lower Nithsdale ====
1. Ae*
2. Beeswing*
3. Caerlaverock*
4. Corberry and Laurieknowe
5. Georgetown*
6. Heathhall*
7. Kingholm Quay
8. Kirkbean*
9. Kirkmahoe*
10. Kirkmichael
11. Lincluden
12. Locharbriggs
13. Lochside and Woodlands*
14. Loreburn*
15. Mouswald°
16. New Abbey*
17. Ryedale
18. Southerness*
19. St Michaels
20. Summerville & Stakeford
21. Terregles*
22. Tinwald Parish*
23. Torthorwald*
24. Troqueer Landward*

==== Upper Nithsdale ====
1. Auldgirth & District*
2. Carronbridge*
3. Closeburn*
4. Dunscore*
5. Durisdeer
6. Glencairn*
7. Holywood & Newbridge*
8. Irongray*
9. Keir*
10. Kirkconnel & Kelloholm*
11. Penpont*
12. Royal Burgh of Sanquhar & District*
13. Thornhill*
14. Tynron*
15. Wanlockhead

=== Stewartry ===
1. Auchencairn*
2. Balmaclellan*
3. Balmaghie*
4. Borgue*
5. Buittle Parish*
6. Carsphairn*
7. Castle Douglas*
8. Colvend & Southwick *
9. Corsock & Kirkpatrick Durham*
10. Crossmichael & District*
11. Dalbeattie*
12. Dalry*
13. Dundrennan*
14. Gatehouse of Fleet*
15. Kelton*
16. Kirkgunzeon*
17. Lochrutton*
18. Parton*
19. Royal Burgh of Kirkcudbright & District*
20. Royal Burgh of New Galloway & Kells Parish*
21. Tongland*
22. Twynholm*
23. Urr or Haugh of Urr*

=== Wigtown ===
1. Cairnryan*
2. Castle Kennedy
3. Cree Valley*
4. Garlieston*
5. Isle of Whithorn*
6. Kirkcolm *
7. Kirkcowan*
8. Kirkmabreck*
9. Kirkmaiden*
10. Leswalt
11. Lochans
12. New Luce *
13. Ochtrelure and Belmont*
14. Old Luce*
15. Port William & District*
16. Portpatrick*
17. Royal Burgh of Whithorn & District*
18. Royal Burgh of Wigtown & District *
19. Sorbie
20. Stoneykirk*
21. Stranraer

== Dundee City ==
As of August 2024, there are 18 community council areas in the council area. Those marked with asterisks have active community councils, those indicated † have less formal 'neighbourhood representative structures'.

1. Ardler † (Village Trust)
2. Broughty Ferry*
3. Charleston
4. City Centre and Harbour*
5. Coldside † (Community Forum)
6. Craigiebank and Craigiebarns
7. Dalclaverhouse / Mill O Mains
8. Douglas, Angus and Craigie
9. Downfield and Brackens
10. Fintry
11. Kirkton † (Community Partnership)
12. Lochee
13. Menzieshill
14. Mid Craigie / Linlathen
15. Stobswell and District † (Forum)
16. West End*
17. Western Gateway
18. Whitfield

== East Ayrshire ==
As of July 2012, there are 35 community council areas in the council area. Those marked with asterisks have active community councils.

1. Auchinleck*
2. Bellfield*
3. Bonnyton*
4. Catrine*
5. Crosshouse*
6. Cumnock *
7. Dalmellington*
8. Dalrymple*
9. Darvel and District*
10. Drongan, Rankinston & Stair*
11. Dunlop & Lugton*
12. Fenwick*
13. Galston*
14. Gatehead
15. Grange/Howard Kilmarnock*
16. Hurlford and Crookedholm*
17. Kilmaurs*
18. Knockentiber
19. Lugar and Logan*
20. Mauchline*
21. Moscow and Waterside*
22. Muirkirk*
23. Netherthird & District*
24. New Cumnock*
25. New Farm Loch*
26. Newmilns and Greenholm*
27. Northwest Kilmarnock
28. Ochiltree*
29. Patna*
30. Piersland-Bentinck*
31. Riccarton Kilmarnock
32. Shortlees Kilmarnock
33. Sorn*
34. Southcraigs-Dean *
35. Stewarton and District*

== East Dunbartonshire ==
As of July 2012, there are 13 community council areas in the council area. Those marked with asterisks have active community councils.

1. Baldernock*
2. Bearsden East*
3. Bearsden North*
4. Bearsden West*
5. Bishopbriggs*
6. Campsie*
7. Kirkintilloch*
8. Lenzie*
9. Milngavie*
10. Milton of Campsie*
11. Torrance*
12. Twechar
13. Waterside*

== East Lothian ==
As of July 2012, there are 20 community council areas in the council area. Those marked with asterisks have active community councils. Representatives from each Community Council form the Association of East Lothian Community Councils which seeks to share knowledge amongst its members.

1. Cockenzie and Port Seton*
2. Dunbar*
3. Dunpender*
4. East Lammermuir (Oldhamstocks, Innerwick, Spott and Stenton)*
5. Garvald and Morham*
6. Gifford*
7. Gullane Area*
8. Haddington and District*
9. Humbie, East and West Saltoun and Bolton*
10. Longniddry*
11. Macmerry and Gladsmuir*
12. Musselburgh and Inveresk*
13. North Berwick*
14. Ormiston*
15. Pencaitland*
16. Prestonpans*
17. Tranent and Elphinstone*
18. Wallyford*
19. West Barns*
20. Whitecraig

== East Renfrewshire ==
As of January 2023, there are 11 community council areas in the council area. Those marked with asterisks have active community councils:

1. Barrhead*
2. Broom, Kirkhill and Mearnskirk*
3. Busby*
4. Clarkston*
5. Crookfur, Greenfarm and Mearns Village*
6. Eaglesham and Waterfoot*
7. Giffnock*
8. Neilston*
9. Netherlee and Stamperland*
10. Thornliebank*
11. Uplawmoor*

== City of Edinburgh ==
As of July 2012, there are 46 community council areas in the council area. Those marked with asterisks have active community councils.

1. Balerno*
2. Colinton*
3. Corstorphine East Craigs/West Craigs*
4. Corstorphine Gyle*
5. Corstorphine & Clermiston*
6. Craigentinny/Meadowbank*
7. Craigleith/Blackhall*
8. Craiglockhart*
9. Craigmillar—Not established.
10. Cramond, Barnton & Cammo*
11. Currie*
12. Davidsons Mains & Silverknowes—Not established.
13. Drylaw/Telford*
14. Fairmilehead*
15. Gilmerton and District*
16. Gorgie/Dalry*
17. Grange/Prestonfield*
18. Granton & District*
19. Hutchison/Chesser—Not established.
20. Juniper Green & Baberton Mains*
21. Kirkliston*
22. Leith Central*
23. Leith Harbour and Newhaven*
24. Leith Links*
25. Liberton and District*
26. Longstone*
27. Marchmont and Sciennes*
28. Merchiston Districts*
29. Morningside*
30. Muirhouse/Salvesen—Not established.
31. Murrayfield*
32. New Town & Broughton*
33. Northfield/Willowbrae*
34. Old Town*
35. Portobello—Not established.
36. Queensferry and District*
37. Ratho and District*
38. Sighthill/Broomhouse/Parkhead*
39. Southside*
40. Stenhouse, Saughton Mains & Whitson*
41. Stockbridge/Inverleith*
42. Tollcross*
43. Trinity and Newhaven*
44. West End*
45. West Pilton/West Granton—Not established.
46. Wester Hailes*

== Na h-Eileanan Siar ==
As of July 2012, there are 30 community council areas in the council area. Those marked with asterisks have active community councils. The communities are listed by decentralisation areas.

=== Lewis ===
1. Airidhantuim
2. Back*
3. Barvas
4. Bernera*
5. Breasclete*
6. Carloway*
7. Kinloch*
8. Laxdale
9. Ness*
10. North Lochs*
11. North Tolsta*
12. Pairc*
13. Point*
14. Sandwick*
15. Shawbost*
16. Stornoway
17. Tong*
18. Uig*

=== Harris ===
1. North*
2. South*
3. Scalpay*

=== Uist ===
1. Berneray*
2. Benbecula*
3. Bornish*
4. Eriskay*
5. Iochdar*
6. Lochboisdale*
7. North *

=== Barra ===
1. Castlebay & Vatersay*
2. Northbay*

== Falkirk ==
As of July 2012, there are 18 community council areas in the council area. Those marked with asterisks have active community councils.

1. Airth Parish*
2. Avonbridge and Standburn
3. Bainsford, Langlees & New Carron*
4. Banknock, Haggs, Longcroft*
5. Blackness*
6. Bo'ness*
7. Bonnybridge*
8. Brightons*
9. Denny & District*
10. Falkirk South*
11. Grahamston, Middlefield & Westfield*
12. Grangemouth & Skinflats*
13. Larbert, Stenhousemuir & Torwood*
14. Lower Braes*
15. Maddiston
16. Polmont*
17. Reddingmuirhead & Wallacestone*
18. Shieldhill & California

== Fife ==
As of July 2012, there are 105 community council areas in the council area. Those marked with asterisks have active community councils.

1. Abbeyview*
2. Abdie & Dunbog*
3. Aberdour*
4. Auchmuty/Woodside (Glenrothes)
5. Auchtermuchty & Strathmiglo*
6. Auchtertool*
7. Balmerino, Kilmany & Logie
8. Balmullo*
9. Bellyeoman*
10. Benarty*
11. Bennochy/Hayfield
12. Blairhall*
13. Boarhills & Dunino*
14. Buckhaven
15. Burntisland*
16. Cairneyhill*
17. Cameron*
18. Cardenden*
19. Carnbee & Arncroach*
20. Carnock & Gowkhall*
21. Central Dunfermline*
22. Ceres & District*
23. Charlestown, Limekilns and Pattiesmuir*
24. Coaltown of Wemyss*
25. Colinsburgh & Kilconquhar*
26. Collessie
27. Cowdenbeath*
28. Crail & District*
29. Creich & Flisk*
30. Crombie*
31. Crossford*
32. Crossgates and Mossgreen*
33. Culross*
34. Cults*
35. Dairsie*
36. Dalgety Bay & Hillend*
37. Dysart
38. East Wemyss and McDuff*
39. Elie & The Royal Burgh of Earlsferry*
40. Falkland & Newton of Falkland*
41. Freuchie*
42. Giffordtown & District*
43. Glenwood (Glenrothes)
44. Guardbridge*
45. Halbeath
46. Headwell
47. High Valleyfield*
48. Hill of Beath
49. Inverkeithing*
50. Izatt Avenue & Nethertown Area
51. Kelty*
52. Kemback, Pitscottie and Blebo*
53. Kennoway*
54. Kettle*
55. Kincardine*
56. Kinghorn*
57. Kinglassie*
58. Kingsbarns*
59. Kingseat*
60. Kirkcaldy East
61. Kirkcaldy North*
62. Kirkcaldy West*
63. Ladybank & District*
64. Largo Area*
65. Largoward & District
66. Leslie*
67. Leuchars*
68. Leven
69. Lochgelly*
70. Low Valleyfield*
71. Lumphinnans*
72. Markinch*
73. Methil
74. Methilhill
75. Milesmark & Baldridge*
76. Milton & Coaltown of Balgonie*
77. Monimail*
78. Moonzie
79. Newburgh*
80. Newport, Wormit & Forgan*
81. North Glenrothes*
82. North Queensferry*
83. Oakley and Comrie*
84. Pitcorthie*
85. Pitteuchar, Stenton and Finglassie*
86. Rosyth*
87. Royal Burgh of Cupar & District*
88. Royal Burgh of Pittenweem & District*
89. Royal Burgh of St Andrews*
90. Royal Burghs of Kilrenny & Anstruther & of Cellardyke*
91. Saline & Steelend*
92. South Parks & Rimbleton (Glenrothes)
93. Springfield*
94. St Monans*
95. Star of Markinch
96. Strathkinness*
97. Tayport Ferryport-on-Craig*
98. Templehall
99. Thornton*
100. Torryburn & Newmills*
101. Touch & Garvock*
102. Townhill*
103. Wellwood
104. West Wemyss
105. Windygates

== Glasgow City ==
As of July 2012, there are 101 community council areas in the council area. Those marked with asterisks have active community councils.

1. Anderston*
2. Arden, Carnwadric, Kennishead & Old Darnley*
3. Auchenshuggle*
4. Baillieston*
5. Balgrayhill
6. Barlanark
7. Blairdardie & Old Drumchapel*
8. Blythswood & Broomielaw
9. Bridgeton & Dalmarnock *
10. Broomhill *
11. Broomhouse *
12. Cadder*
13. Calton *
14. Camlachie
15. Carmunnock*
16. Carmyle*
17. Castlemilk
18. Cathcart & District*
19. Claythorn*
20. Craigton*
21. Cranhill
22. Croftfoot & Menock*
23. Crosshill & Govanhill*
24. Darnley & Southpark Village*
25. Dennistoun*
26. Dowanhill, Hyndland & Kelvinside*
27. Drumchapel*
28. Drumoyne*
29. Dumbreck*
30. Dundasvale
31. Easterhouse Central
32. Easterhouse North
33. Fullarton
34. Garnethill*
35. Garrowhill*
36. Gartcraig*
37. Garthamlock & Craigend*
38. Gartloch*
39. Germiston*
40. Govan*
41. Govan East*
42. Hillhead*
43. Hillington, North Cardonald & Penilee*
44. Hurlet & Brockburn
45. Hutchesontown*
46. Ibrox Cessnock*
47. Jordanhill*
48. Kelvindale*
49. Kings Park and Croftfoot*
50. Kinning Park*
51. Knightswood*
52. Knightswood North & Templar*
53. Lambhill & District*
54. Langside, Battlefield & Camphill*
55. Laurieston*
56. Levern & District*
57. Mansewood & Hillpark
58. Maryhill & Summerston*
59. Merchant City*
60. Milton*
61. Molendinar*
62. Mosspark*
63. Mount Florida*
64. Mount Vernon*
65. Newlands & Auldhouse*
66. North Kelvin*
67. Oatlands*
68. Parkhead*
69. Parkhouse*
70. Partick*
71. Petershill
72. Pollok*
73. Pollok North*
74. Pollokshaws & Eastwood*
75. Pollokshields*
76. Possilpark*
77. Robroyston*
78. Royston
79. Ruchazie
80. Ruchill*
81. Sandyhills*
82. Scotstoun*
83. Shawlands & Strathbungo*
84. Shettleston
85. Sighthill*
86. Simshill & Old Cathcart*
87. South Cardonald & Crookston*
88. Springboig
89. Springburn Central
90. Swinton*
91. Thornwood*
92. Toryglen*
93. Townhead & Ladywell*
94. Wallacewell*
95. Wellhouse & Queenslie*
96. Whiteinch*
97. Woodlands & Park*
98. Woodside*
99. Wyndford & District*
100. Yoker*
101. Yorkhill & Kelvingrove*

== Highland ==
As of June 2015, there are 157 community council areas in the council area, three of which are not currently established. Those marked with asterisks have active community councils.

=== Caithness, Sutherland and Easter Ross ===
1. Alness*
2. Ardgay and District*
3. Ardross*
4. Assynt*
5. Balintore and Hilton*
6. Berriedale and Dunbeath*
7. Bettyhill, Strathnaver and Altnaharra*
8. Bower*
9. Brora*
10. Caithness West*
11. Castletown*
12. Creich*
13. Dornoch*
14. Dunnet and Canisbay*
15. Durness*
16. Edderton*
17. Fearn*
18. Golspie*
19. Halkirk*
20. Helmsdale*
21. Inver*
22. Invergordon*
23. Kilmuir Easter and Logie Easter*
24. Kinlochbervie*
25. Lairg*
26. Latheron, Lybster and Clyth*
27. Melvich*
28. Nigg and Shandwick*
29. Rogart*
30. Saltburn and Westwood*
31. Scourie*
32. Sinclairs Bay*
33. Strathy and Armadale*
34. Tain*
35. Tannach and District*
36. Tarbat*
37. Thurso*
38. Tongue*
39. Watten*
40. Wick*

=== Inverness, Nairn, Badenoch and Strathspey ===
1. Ardersier and Petty*
2. Auldearn*
3. Aviemore*
4. Ballifeary*
5. Balloch*
6. Beauly*
7. Boat of Garten*
8. Carrbridge*
9. Cawdor And West Nairnshire*
10. Central
11. Cromdale and Advie*
12. Crown*
13. Croy*
14. Culcabock and Drakies*
15. Dalneigh and Columba*
16. Dalwhinnie*
17. Dores and Essich*
18. Dulnain Bridge*
19. East Nairnshire*
20. Fort Augustus and Glenmoriston*
21. Glenurquhart*
22. Grantown On Spey*
23. Hilton, Milton and Castle Heather*
24. Holm*
25. Inverness South*
26. Inverness West*
27. Kilmorack*
28. Kiltarlity*
29. Kincraig*
30. Kingussie*
31. Kirkhill and Bunchrew*
32. Laggan
33. Lochardil*
34. Merkinch*
35. Muirtown*
36. Nairn - Suburban*
37. Nairn - West*
38. Nairn River*
39. Nethy Bridge*
40. Newtonmore*
41. Park*
42. Raigmore*
43. Smithton and Culloden*
44. Strathdearn*
45. Stratherrick and Foyers*
46. Strathglass*
47. Strathnairn*
48. Westhill*

=== Ross, Skye and Lochaber ===
1. Acharacle*
2. Applecross*
3. Ardgour*
4. Arisaig*
5. Aultbea*
6. Avoch and Killen*
7. Ballachulish*
8. Braes (not on list with map on page *8 of scheme)*
9. Broadford and Strath*
10. Caol
11. Coigach*
12. Conon Bridge*
13. Contin*
14. Cromarty*
15. Dingwall*
16. Dornie And District*
17. Dunvegan*
18. Duror and Kentallen*
19. Ferintosh*
20. Fort William*
21. Fortrose and Rosemarkie*
22. Gairloch*
23. Garve and District*
24. Glencoe and Glen Etive*
25. Glendale*
26. Glenelg and Arnisdale*
27. Glenfinnan*
28. Glengarry*
29. Inverlochy and Torlundy*
30. Killearnan*
31. Kilmallie*
32. Kilmuir*
33. Kiltearn*
34. Kinlochleven*
35. Knockbain*
36. Kyle*
37. Kyleakin and Kylerhea*
38. Lochalsh*
39. Lochbroom*
40. Lochcarron*
41. Lochduich*
42. Mallaig*
43. Marybank, Scatwell and Strathconon*
44. Maryburgh*
45. Minginish*
46. Morar*
47. Morvern*
48. Muir of Ord*
49. Nether Lochaber*
50. Plockton*
51. Portree*
52. Raasay*
53. Resolis*
54. Sconser*
55. Shieldaig*
56. Skeabost*
57. Sleat*
58. Small Isles*
59. Spean Bridge, Roy Bridge and Achnacarry*
60. Staffin*
61. Strathpeffer*
62. Stromeferry*
63. Struan*
64. Sunart*
65. Torridon and Kinlochewe*
66. Uig*
67. Waternish*
68. Wester Loch Ewe*
69. Western Ardnamurchan*

== Inverclyde ==
As of February 2023, there are 11 community council areas in the council area. Those marked with asterisks have active community councils.

1. Gourock*
2. Greenock Central
3. Greenock East
4. Greenock Southwest*
5. Greenock West and Cardwell Bay*
6. Holefarm and Cowdenknowes
7. Inverkip and Wemyss Bay*
8. Kilmacolm*
9. Larkfield, Braeside and Branchton*
10. Port Glasgow East
11. Port Glasgow West*

== Midlothian ==
As of July 2012, there are 16 community council areas in the council area. Those marked with asterisks have active community councils.

1. Bonnyrigg and Lasswade*
2. Dalkeith and district*
3. Damhead and district*
4. Danderhall and district*
5. Eskbank and Newbattle*
6. Gorebridge*
7. Howgate*
8. Loanhead and district*
9. Mayfield and Easthouses*
10. Moorfoot*
11. Newtongrange*
12. Penicuik and district*
13. Poltonhall and district*
14. Rosewell and district*
15. Roslin and Bilston*
16. Tynewater*

== Moray ==
As of August 2024, there are 20 community council areas in the council area, 17 of which (marked with asterisks) have active community councils.

1. Buckie and District*
2. Burghead and Cummingston*
3. Cullen and Deskford*
4. Dufftown and District
5. Dyke Landward*
6. Elgin*
7. Finderne*
8. Findhorn and Kinloss*
9. Findochty and District*
10. Forres*
11. Glenlivet
12. Heldon*
13. Hopeman and Covesea
14. Innes*
15. Keith*
16. Lennox*
17. Lossiemouth*
18. Portknockie*
19. Speyside*
20. Strathisla*

== North Ayrshire ==
As of July 2012, there are 17 community council areas in the council area. Those marked with asterisks have active community councils.

1. Ardrossan
2. Arran*
3. Beith & District*
4. Cumbrae*
5. Dalry*
6. Dreghorn
7. Fairlie*
8. Girdle Toll & Bourtreehill
9. Irvine*
10. Kilbirnie & Glengarnock*
11. Kilwinning*
12. Largs*
13. Saltcoats*
14. Skelmorlie*
15. Springside
16. Stevenston
17. West Kilbride*

== North Lanarkshire ==
As of July 2012, there are 81 community council areas in the council area. Those marked with asterisks have active community councils.

1. Abronhill and Arns
2. Allanton and Hartwood
3. Auchinloch*
4. Balloch and Eastfield
5. Banton and Kelvinhead*
6. Bargeddie
7. Bellshill*
8. Blackwood and Craiglinn
9. Blairhill
10. Cairnhill*
11. Calder
12. Calder Valley
13. Calderbank
14. Caldercruix
15. Cambusnethan
16. Carbrain and Hillcrest*
17. Carfin*
18. Carrickstone
19. Castlecary*
20. Central Coatbridge*
21. Central Wishaw*
22. Chapelhall
23. Chapelside
24. Chryston*
25. Clarkston
26. Cleland
27. Cliftonville*
28. Coatdyke
29. Coltness*
30. Condorrat*
31. Craigmarloch*
32. Craigneuk*
33. Croy
34. Dullatur*
35. Forgewood
36. Gartcosh*
37. Gartlea
38. Gartness
39. Glenboig
40. Glencairn
41. Glenmavis*
42. Golfhill, Burnfoot and Commonside
43. Greenfaulds and Luggiebank
44. Greengairs*
45. Harthill and Eastfield*
46. Holehills, Rawyards and Thrashbush
47. Holytown
48. Kildrum*
49. Kilsyth*
50. Kirkshaws
51. Kirkwood
52. Ladywell*
53. Langloan
54. Longriggend
55. Monkland Glen*
56. Moodiesburn
57. Mossend
58. Muirhouse and Flemington*
59. Netherton and Gowkthrapple
60. New Stevenston
61. Newarthill
62. Newmains and District*
63. North Calder*
64. North Motherwell
65. Old Monkland
66. Overtown and Waterloo*
67. Plains*
68. Queenzieburn*
69. Salsburgh*
70. Seafar and Ravenswood*
71. Shawhead
72. Shotts*
73. Stepps and District*
74. Sunnyside
75. Thorniewood*
76. The Village*
77. Townhead
78. Westerwood*
79. Westfield*
80. Whifflet
81. Whinhall

== Orkney ==
As of July 2012, there are 20 community council areas in the council area. Those marked with asterisks have active community councils.

1. Birsay*
2. Eday*
3. Evie and Rendall*
4. Firth and Stenness*
5. Flotta*
6. Graemsay, Hoy and Walls*
7. Harray and Sandwick*
8. Holm*
9. Kirkwall & St Ola*
10. North Ronaldsay*
11. Orphir*
12. Papa Westray*
13. Rousay, Egilsay, Wyre & Gairsay*
14. Sanday *
15. Shapinsay*
16. South Ronaldsay and Burray*
17. St Andrews and Deerness*
18. Stromness*
19. Stronsay*
20. Westray*

== Perth and Kinross ==
As of July 2012, there are 52 community council areas in the council area. Those marked with asterisks have active community councils.

1. Aberfeldy*
2. Abernethy and District*
3. Alyth*
4. Auchterarder and District*
5. Auchtergaven*
6. Blackford*
7. Blair Atholl and Struan*
8. Blairgowrie and Rattray*
9. Braco and Greenloaning*
10. Bridgend, Gannochy and Kinnoull*
11. Burrelton and District*
12. Central
13. City South
14. Cleish and Blairadam*
15. Comrie and District*
16. Coupar Angus and Bendochy*
17. Crieff*
18. Dull and Weem*
19. Dunkeld and Birnam*
20. Dunning*
21. Earn*
22. East Strathearn*
23. Errol*
24. Fossoway*
25. Glenfarg*
26. Glenlyon and Loch Tay*
27. Inchture*
28. Invergowrie and Kingoodie
29. Kenmore and District*
30. Kettins*
31. Killiecrankie and Fincastle*
32. Kinross*
33. Letham
34. Longforgan*
35. Luncarty, Redgorton and Moneydie*
36. Meigle and Ardler*
37. Methven*
38. Mid Atholl, Strathtay and Grandtully*
39. Milnathort*
40. Mount Blair*
41. Muthill and Tullibardine*
42. North Inch and Muirton*
43. North Muirton*
44. Pitlochry and Moulin*
45. Portmoak*
46. Rannoch and Tummel*
47. Scone and District*
48. Spittalfield and District*
49. St Fillans*
50. Stanley*
51. Tulloch
52. West Carse*

== Renfrewshire ==
At February 2023, there are 25 community council areas in the council area. Those marked with asterisks have active community councils.

1. Bishopton*
2. Bridge of Weir*
3. Brookfield*
4. Charleston
5. Elderslie*
6. Erskine*
7. Ferguslie*
8. Foxbar and Brediland
9. Gallowhill
10. Glenburn
11. Hawkhead and Lochfield*
12. Houston*
13. Howwood*
14. Hunterhill
15. Inchinnan*
16. Johnstone*
17. Kilbarchan*
18. Langbank*
19. Linwood*
20. Lochwinnoch*
21. Paisley East and Whitehaugh*
22. Paisley North*
23. Paisley West and Central*
24. Ralston*
25. Renfrew*

== Scottish Borders ==
As of July 2012, there are 67 community council areas in the council area. Those marked with asterisks have active community councils.

1. Abbey St Bathans, Bonkyl and Preston*
2. Ancrum*
3. Ayton*
4. Bowden*
5. Burnfoot*
6. Burnmouth*
7. Carlops*
8. Chirnside*
9. Clovenfords and District*
10. Cockburnspath*
11. Coldingham*
12. Coldstream and District*
13. Crailing, Eckford and Nisbet*
14. Cranshaws, Ellemford and Longformacus*
15. Denholm and District*
16. Duns*
17. Earlston*
18. Eddleston and District*
19. Ednam, Stichill and Berrymoss*
20. Edrom, Allanton and Whitsome
21. Ettrick and Yarrow*
22. Eyemouth*
23. Floors, Makerstoun, Nenthorn and Smailholm*
24. Foulden, Mordington, & Lamberton*
25. Galashiels and Langlee*
26. Gavinton, Fogo and Polwarth*
27. Gordon and Westruther*
28. Grantshouse*
29. Greenlaw and Hume
30. Hawick*
31. Heiton and Roxburgh*
32. Heriot*
33. Hobkirk*
34. Hutton and Paxton*
35. Innerleithen and District*
36. Jed Valley*
37. Jedburgh*
38. Kalewater*
39. Kelso*
40. Lamancha, Newlands and Kirkurd*
41. Lanton*
42. Lauderdale*
43. Leitholm, Eccles and Birgham*
44. Lilliesleaf, Ashkirk and Midlem*
45. Manor, Stobo and Lyne*
46. Maxton and Mertoun*
47. Melrose and District*
48. Newcastleton and District*
49. Newtown and Eildon*
50. Oxnam Water*
51. Oxton and Channelkirk*
52. Reston and Auchencrow*
53. Royal Burgh of Peebles and District*
54. Royal Burgh of Selkirk and District*
55. Skirling*
56. Southdean*
57. Sprouston*
58. St Abbs*
59. St Boswells Parish*
60. Stow and Fountainhall*
61. Swinton and Ladykirk*
62. Tweedbank*
63. Upper Teviotdale and Borthwick Water*
64. Upper Tweed*
65. Walkerburn and District*
66. West Linton*
67. Yetholm*

== Shetland ==
As of July 2012, there are 18 community council areas in the council area. Those marked with asterisks have active community councils.

1. Bressay*
2. Burra and Trondra*
3. Delting*
4. Dunrossness*
5. Fetlar*
6. Gulberwick, Quarff and Cunningsburgh*
7. Lerwick*
8. Nesting and Lunnasting*
9. Northmaven*
10. Sandness and Walls*
11. Sandsting and Aithsting*
12. Sandwick*
13. Scalloway*
14. Skerries*
15. Tingwall, Whiteness and Weisdale*
16. Unst*
17. Whalsay*
18. Yell*

== South Ayrshire ==
As of July 2012, there are 29 community council areas in the council area. Those marked with asterisks have active community councils.

1. Alloway and Doonfoot*
2. Annbank and Coylton*
3. Ballantrae*
4. Barr*
5. Barrhill*
6. Belmont and Kincaidston*
7. Colmonell and Lendalfoot*
8. Craigie*
9. Crosshill, Straiton and Kirkmichael*
10. Dailly*
11. Dundonald*
12. Dunure*
13. Forehill, Holmston and Masonhill*
14. Fort, Seafield and Wallacetown*
15. Girvan and District*
16. Kirkoswald, Maidens and Turnberry*
17. Loans*
18. Maybole*
19. Minishant*
20. Monkton
21. Mossblown and St Quivox*
22. Newton and Heathfield*
23. North Ayr*
24. Pinwherry and Pinmore*
25. Prestwick North*
26. Prestwick South*
27. Symington*
28. Tarbolton*
29. Troon*

== South Lanarkshire ==
As of July 2012, there are 58 community council areas in the council area. Those marked with asterisks have active community councils.

=== Cambuslang/Rutherglen ===
1. Burnside*
2. Cambuslang*
3. Halfway*
4. Rutherglen*

=== Clydesdale ===
1. Biggar*
2. Blackmount*
3. Blackwood and Kirkmuirhill
4. Carluke*
5. Carmichael
6. Carnwath*
7. Carstairs
8. Clyde Valley
9. Coalburn*
10. Crawford*
11. Douglas
12. Douglas Water and Rigside
13. Duneaton*
14. Forth
15. Leadhills*
16. Lesmahagow*
17. Quothquan and Thankerton*
18. New Lanark*
19. Pettinain*
20. Symington*
21. Tarbrax*
22. The Royal Burgh of Lanark*

=== East Kilbride ===
1. Calderwood*
2. East Mains*
3. Greenhills
4. Hairmyres
5. Jackton and Thorntonhall*
6. Lindsay, Auldhouse and Chapelton*
7. Murray*
8. Sandford and Upper Avondale*
9. St. Leonards*
10. Stewartfield
11. Strathaven*
12. West Mains
13. Westwood*
14. Whitehills

=== Hamilton ===
1. Ashgill/Netherburn*
2. Blantyre
3. Bothwell*
4. Burnbank
5. Earnock
6. Hamilton Centre
7. Hamilton Centre and Ferniegair
8. Hillhouse*
9. Larkhall*
10. Low Waters
11. Meikle Earnock
12. Quarter and Cadzow
13. Silvertonhill
14. Stonehouse*
15. Uddingston*
16. Udston
17. Wellhall
18. Whitehill

== Stirling ==
The area is divided into 42 community council areas, all of which have community councils as at 2023.

1. Arnprior
2. Balfron
3. Balquhidder, Lochearnhead and Strathyre
4. Bannockburn
5. Braehead and Broomridge
6. Bridge of Allan
7. Buchanan
8. Buchlyvie
9. Callander
10. Cambusbarron
11. Cambuskenneth
12. Carron Valley and District
13. Causewayhead
14. Cornton
15. Cowie
16. Croftamie
17. Drymen
18. Dunblane
19. Fintry
20. Gargunnock
21. Gartmore
22. Hillpark and Milton
23. Killearn
24. Killin
25. Kilmadock
26. King's Park
27. Kippen
28. Logie
29. Mercat Cross
30. Plean
31. Polmaise
32. Port of Menteith
33. Raploch
34. Riverside
35. St Ninians
36. Strathard
37. Strathblane
38. Strathfillan
39. Thornhill and Blairdrummond
40. Throsk
41. Torbrex
42. Trossachs

== West Dunbartonshire ==
As of July 2012, there are 17 community council areas in the council area. Those marked with asterisks have active community councils.

1. Alexandria
2. Balloch and Haldane*
3. Bonhill and Dalmonach*
4. Bowling and Milton*
5. Clydebank East*
6. Dalmuir and Mountblow*
7. Dumbarton East and Central*
8. Dumbarton North
9. Dumbarton West
10. Duntocher and Hardgate*
11. Faifley*
12. Kilmaronock*
13. Linnvale and Drumry*
14. Old Kilpatrick*
15. Parkhall, North Kilbowie and Central*
16. Renton
17. Silverton and Overtoun*

== West Lothian ==
As of July 2012, there are 40 community council areas in the council area. Those marked with asterisks have active community councils.

1. Addiewell/Loganlea*
2. Armadale*
3. Bathgate*
4. Bellsquarry*
5. Blackburn*
6. Blackridge*
7. Breich*
8. Bridgend*
9. Broxburn*
10. Carmondean
11. Craigshill*
12. Deans
13. Dechmont*
14. Dedridge*
15. East Calder & Wilkieston*
16. Ecclesmachan & Threemiletown*
17. Eliburn
18. Fauldhouse*
19. Howden
20. Kirknewton*
21. Knightsridge*
22. Ladywell*
23. Linlithgow & Linlithgow Bridge*
24. Livingston Village*
25. Longridge*
26. Mid Calder*
27. Murieston*
28. Newton*
29. Philpstoun*
30. Polbeth*
31. Pumpherston*
32. Seafield*
33. Stoneyburn*
34. Torphichen*
35. Uphall*
36. Uphall Station*
37. West Calder & Harburn*
38. Westfield & Bridgehouse*
39. Whitburn & Greenrigg*
40. Winchburgh*

== See also ==
- List of civil parishes in Scotland
- Local government in Scotland
