= Doug Coulston =

Scottish footballer (born 1971)

Personal information
- Date of birth: 12 August 1971 (age 55)
- Place of birth: Glasgow, Scotland
- Position: Midfielder

Senior career*
Years	Team	Apps	(Gls)
1993–1995	Meadowbank Thistle	4	(0)
1995–1996	Livingston	1	(0)
1996–1998	Cowdenbeath	32	(5)
1998–1999	Montrose	46	(4)
1999–2001	Brechin	54	(7)
2001–2002	East Fife	4	(0)
2002–2003	Brechin	6	(1)
2003–2004	Montrose	6	(0)
- * Club domestic league appearances and goals

Doug Coulston (born 12 August 1971) is a Scottish footballer who played as a midfielder for Livingston.

== Playing career ==
Coulston began his professional career playing at Meadowbank Thistle. He remained at the club during their renaming and relocation in 1995. The midfielder departed the club in 1996 having made 5 appearances in total for Meadowbank Thistle and Livingston.

After leaving the Almondvale Stadium, he had spells at Cowdenbeath and Montrose.

The midfielder signed for Angus rivals Brechin in 1999 and went on to make 54 appearances for the City, including a fourth round Scottish Cup defeat against Rangers at Ibrox Stadium.

He signed for East Fife in 2001, but struggled to make an impact at the club. After 4 appearances that season, he departed the club to return to Brechin.

Coulston's appearances for the City were limited in his second spell, and he left the club once again after just 6 appearances during the 2002–2003 season. He re-signed for Montrose in the summer of 2003 and made 6 appearances before retiring from playing a year later.

== Post-playing career ==
After retiring from professional football, Coulston has been working as a PE teacher at St Columba's Roman Catholic High School.
