= Alexandra Jakob =

Australian businesswoman and investor

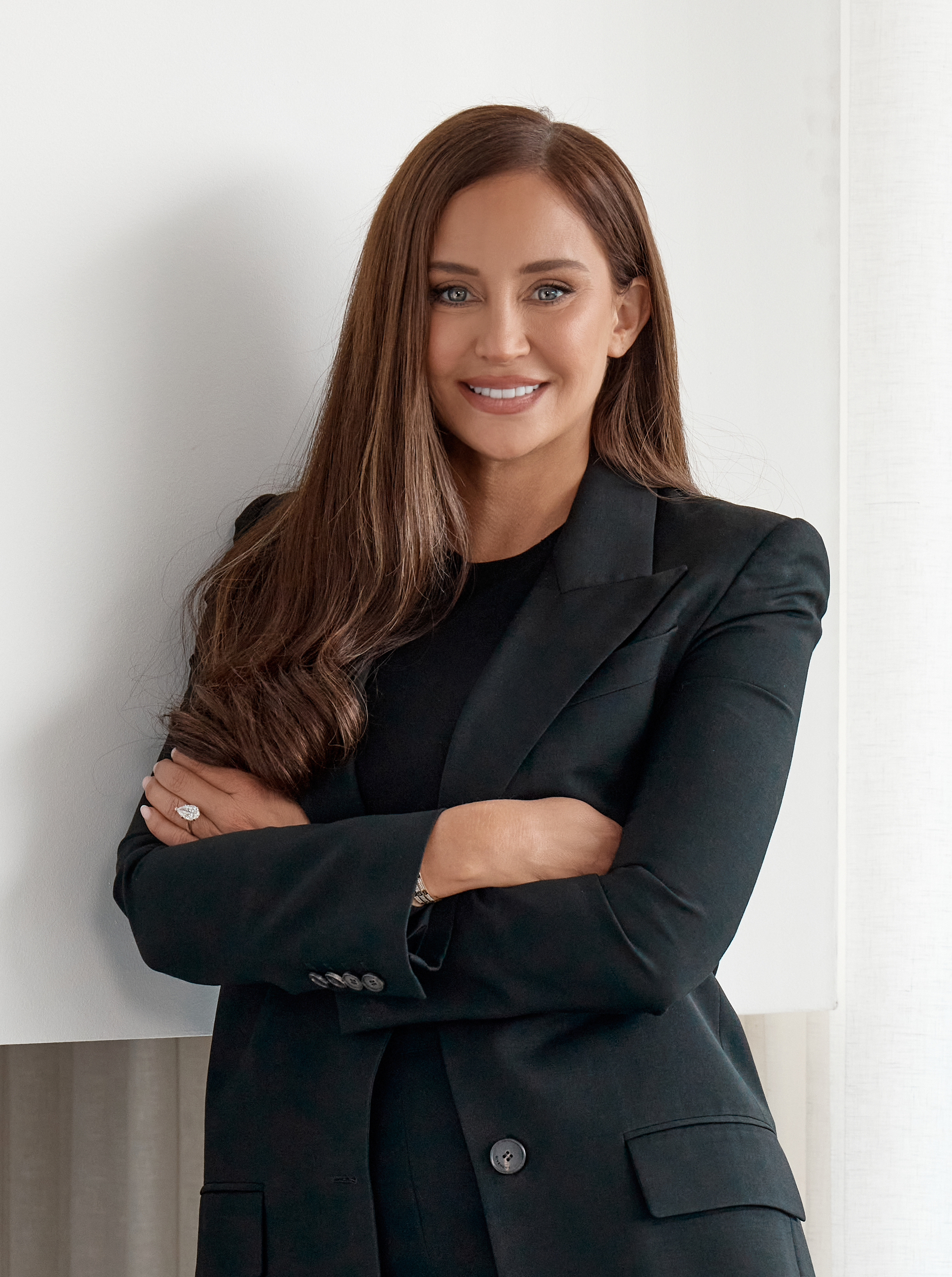
- Jakob in 2025
- Citizenship: Australia
- Occupations: Businesswoman and investor
- Known for: Founder, BondiBoost; Founder, Little Learning School; Executive producer, Memory Bites
- Spouse: Michael Burn (m. 2026)
- Website: alexandrajakob.com.au

Alexandra Jakob is an Australian businesswoman, investor, and executive producer. She was the founder of ventures including Little Learning School, which was acquired by Bain Capital and Busy Bees Nurseries, and BondiBoost, a haircare brand acquired by Gauge Capital. In 2024, she founded Globe Wealth, a private investment firm. She is the executive producer of television series Memory Bites with Matt Moran.

== Career ==
Jakob opened her first childcare centre in Sydney in 2006. Over twelve years, she expanded Little Learning School to a network of 54 privately owned childcare centres with 2,500 employees in New South Wales, Canberra, and Melbourne. In 2018, the majority of centres were acquired by Bain Capital for a reported A$150 million. The remaining centres were later acquired by Busy Bees Nurseries in 2020.

In 2018, Jakob founded BondiBoost, an Australian haircare brand which later sold products through salons and international retailers in the US, Canada, and the UK such as Sephora and Boots. The business was acquired by Gauge Capital in 2021.

In 2019, Jakob purchased a Point Piper harbourfront mansion for A$40 million from Westpac director Steve Harker, which she listed five years later for A$100 million. In 2023, she became an investor in Iberica, a restaurant in Bondi.

In 2024, Jakob founded Globe Wealth, a private investment firm that invests in high-growth businesses. In the same year, she co-produced the television series Memory Bites with Matt Moran as its executive producer.

== Personal life ==
Alexandra was married to Gabriel Jakob whom she later divorced. She became a mother in her twenties. In 2022, the couple jointly purchased three adjoining waterfront properties in Point Piper for a combined sum of about A$100 million.

In 2025, she was engaged to Michael Burn.
