= Woodmill High School =

Secondary school in Fife, Scotland

Coordinates: 56.0704°N 3.4260°W

Information
- Established: 1960; 66 years ago
- Local authority: Fife Council
- Website: https://woodmill.fife.sch.uk/

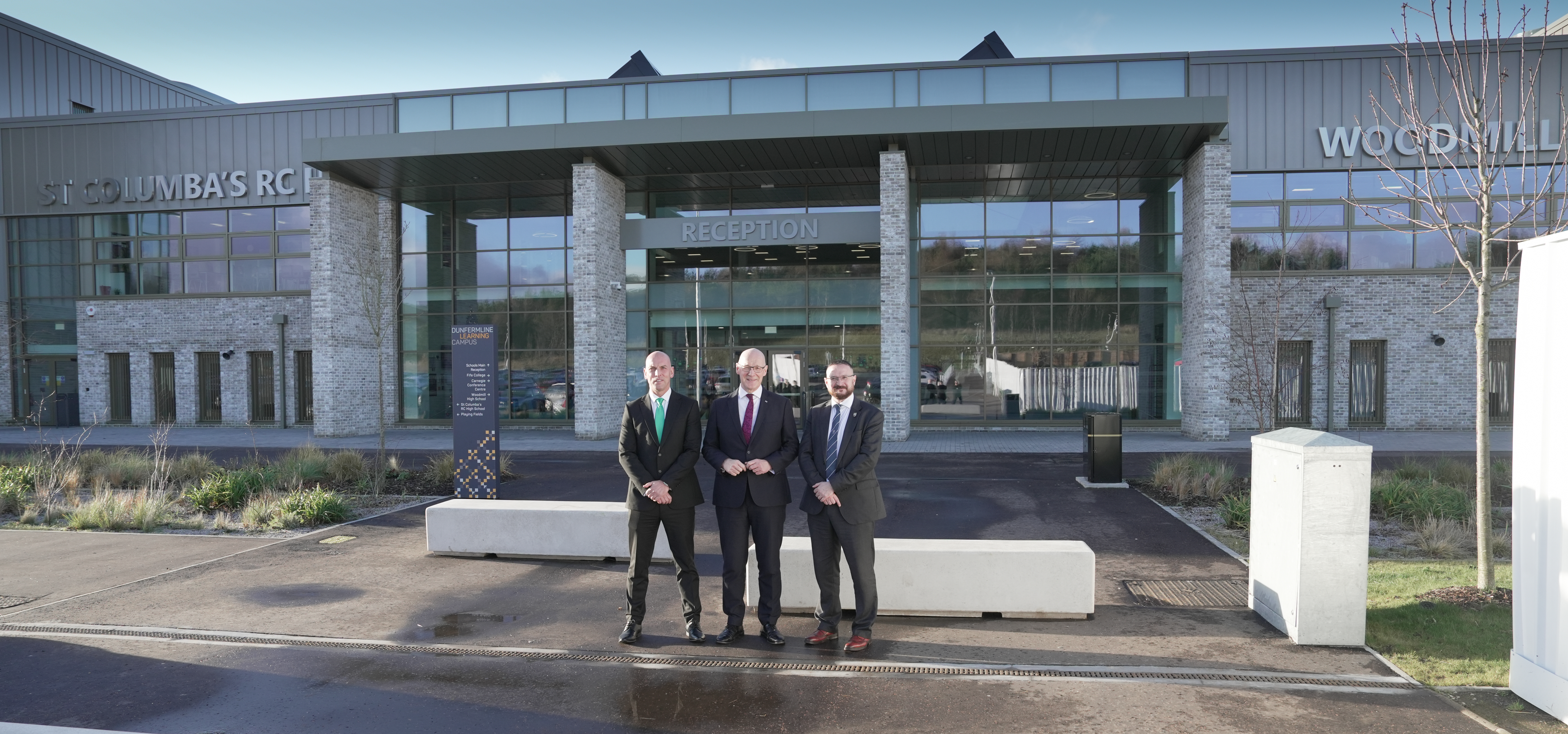
Scottish First Minister John Swinney at the opening of the Dunfermline Learning Campus.

Woodmill High School is a local authority-run high school in Dunfermline, Scotland. It is one of the city's four high schools.

Designs were proposed for the school in 1958, and construction finished in 1960. It was built to serve the expanding estates of Abbeyview, Touch, Brucefield and Garvock. The name Woodmill comes from the former purpose of the land it was built on. It was initially a secondary school, but was upgraded to full high school status in 1968. The catchment area includes Duloch, Carnegie, Touch and Linburn.

== Former pupils ==
Singer and actress Barbara Dickson attended the school in the early 1960s. She dedicated her debut album to Sandy Sadler, one of her music teachers at Woodmill. In her autobiography, she quotes Sadler as telling her, "You may not be the best singer in the class, but you are certainly the loudest".

Former pupil Murray McCallum has played international rugby union for Scotland.

== Replacement ==
Fife Council confirmed that they would be replacing the old school buildings. A March 2019 proposal suggested building a new campus, which would host Woodmill, St Columba's Roman Catholic High School, and Fife College. In 2024, the campus was completed and was ready to be used for the new school year starting in August.

== 2019 fire ==
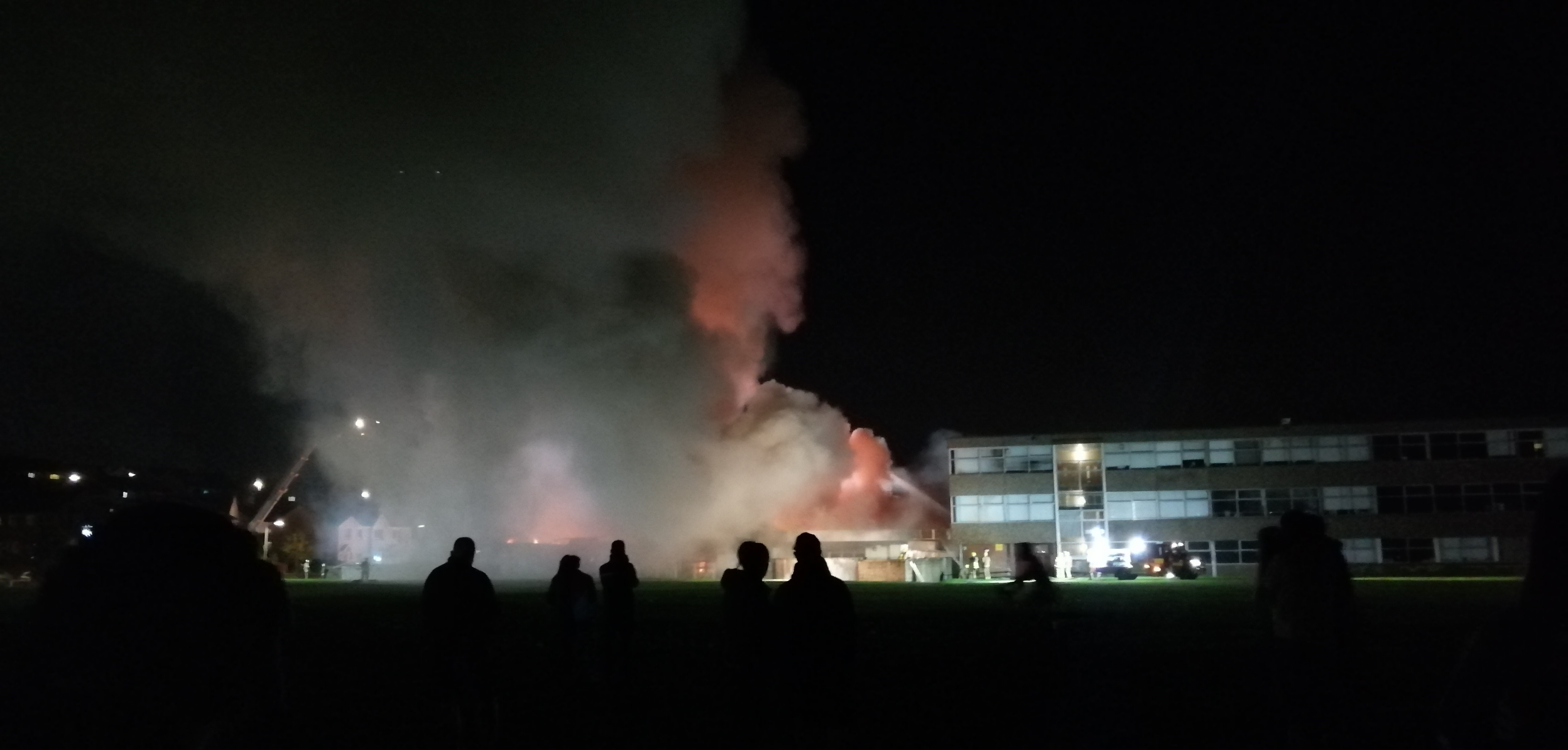
The view of the fire at night

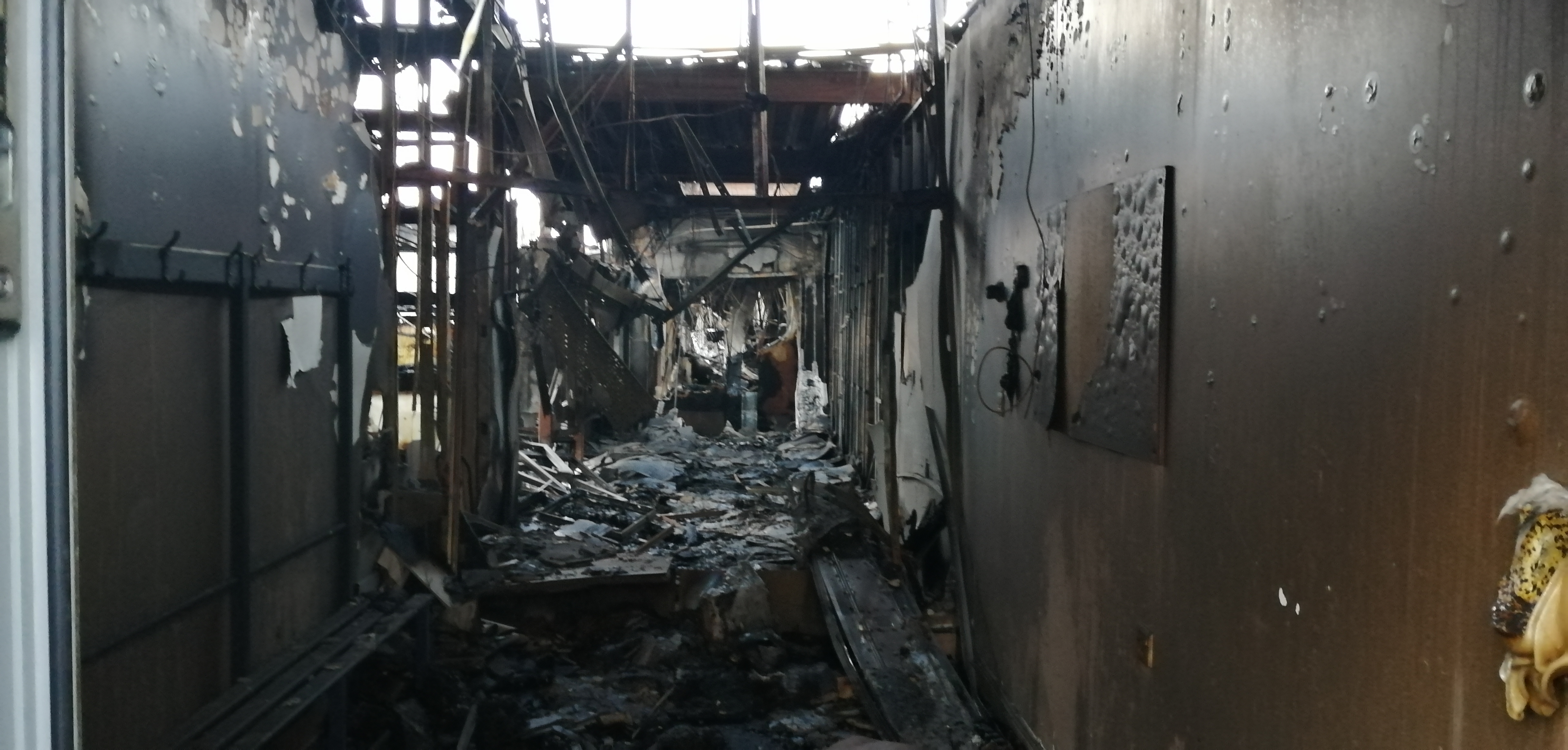
A view of inside the DAS building after the fire.

Woodmill was seriously damaged by a large fire which started on 25 August 2019, which was reported at 5:05 p.m. and continued to burn into the next day. The fire originally started in the school's Department of Additional Support (DAS), which was for people who needed additional support with learning difficulties. The fire destroyed everything in the DAS and had spread over other parts of the school, including the E, F and G corridors, the cafeteria and the catwalk.

Over 80 firefighters fought the fire; many of those firefighters came from different parts of Scotland. During the fight with the fire, surrounding homes around the area had their water supply affected as the firefighters used many hydrants, which affected the local water supply.

=== Aftermath and local impact ===
The school was closed on 26 August 2019. Fife Council announced a plan to determine where pupils and staff would work and learn on 31 August. All 1400 pupils were back in full-time education at other schools and sites across West Fife just 5 days after the fire.

Following the blaze, a 14-year-old boy was charged with wilful fire raising. The boy's father turned him in to the police.

The local community provided additional support to pupils. £9000 was raised in a crowdfunding campaign hosted on Just Giving by over 470 backers, which has superseded the original £1000 goal.

The school reopened in January 2020.
