= Queen Anne High School =

Queen Anne High School may refer to different schools, including:

- Queen Anne High School Dunfermline in Fife, Scotland
- Queen Anne High School (Seattle, Washington) in Seattle, Washington, United States
- Queen Anne's County High School in Centreville, Maryland, United States
