= Wellwood, Fife =

Village in Fife, Scotland

Coordinates: 56.0625°N 3.4019°W

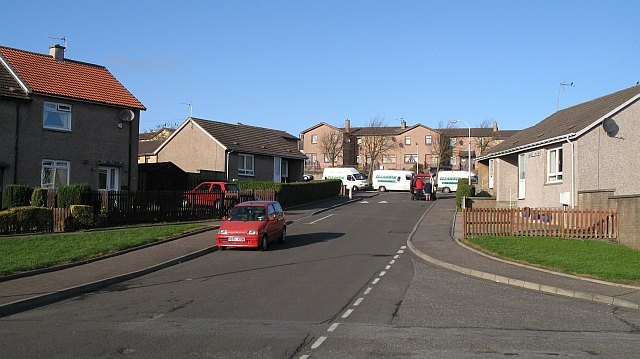
Canmore Terrace, Wellwood

Wellwood is a small village to the north of Dunfermline, Fife, Scotland. It was named after the Wellwoods who used to own coalmines in the area. It has a leisure centre and a golf course (Canmore). It is nearby the Town Loch and also is partially bordered by Queen Anne High School. It was formerly known as Hawkiesfauld.

Wellwood is an old coal mining village. The coal pits in the village were active throughout the nineteenth century and into twentieth.

== Education ==
The village had one school, Wellwood Primary School, which was closed in 2014. Wellwood is now under the catchment area for McLean Primary School. Pupils then attend Queen Anne High School.
