= Halbeath =

Human settlement in Fife, Scotland, UK

Coordinates: 56.0802°N 3.4100°W

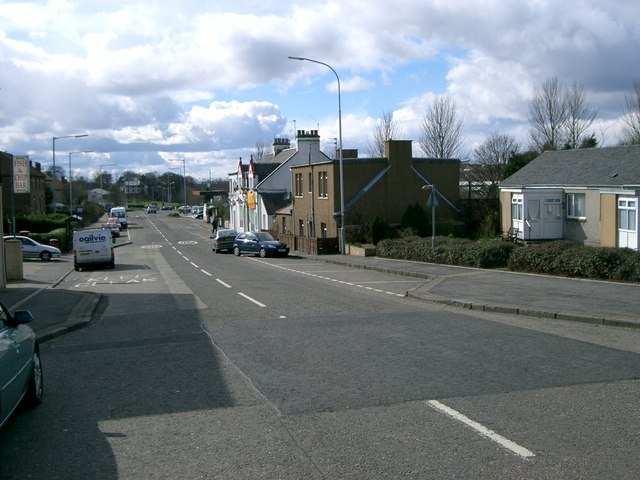
Halbeath Main Street

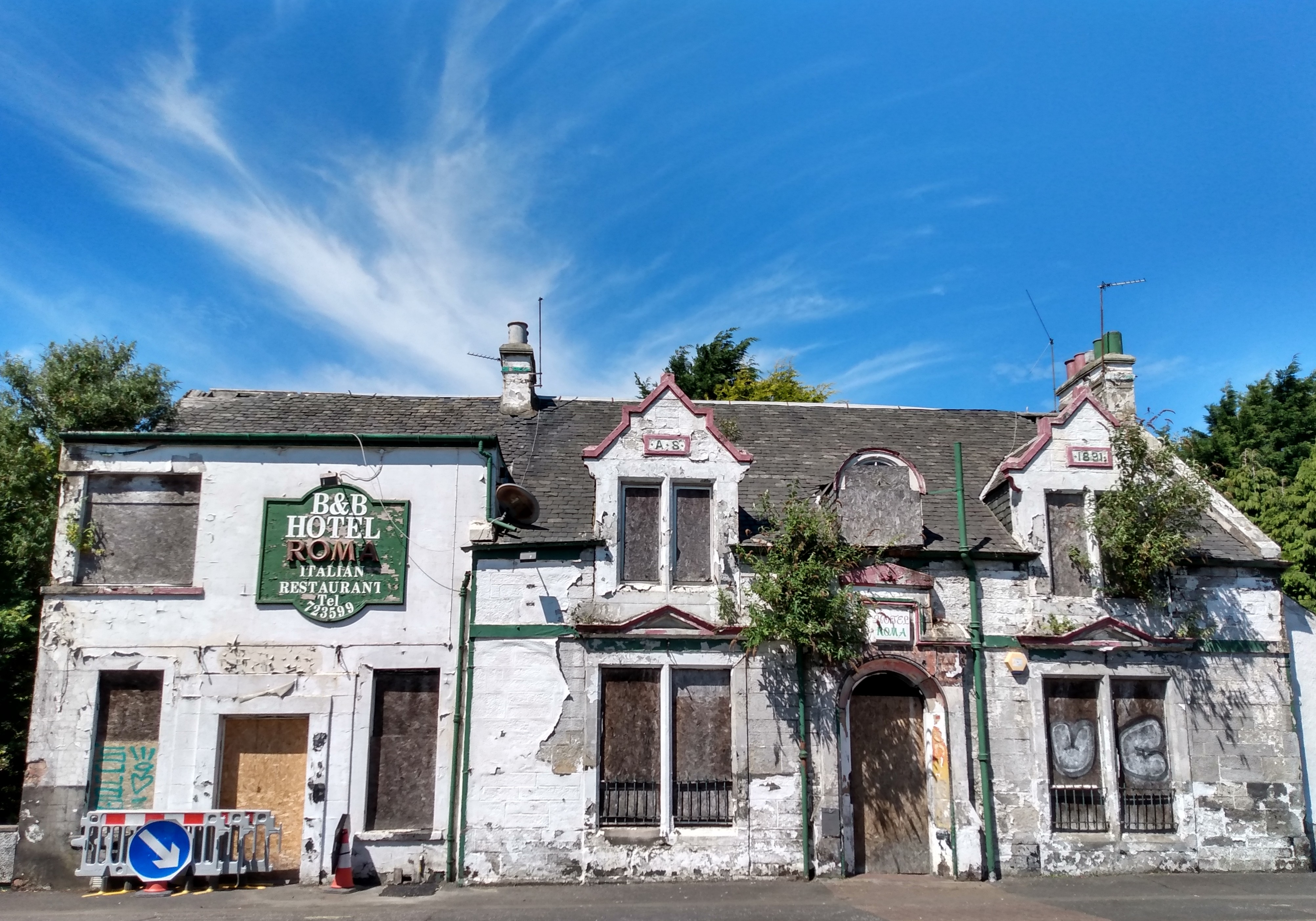
The derelict 1890s former Hotel Roma on Main Street in Halbeath.

Halbeath is a village northeast of Dunfermline, Fife, Scotland. It derives its name from the Gaelic choil beath, which means "wood of birches", and began as a colliery village. In the summer of 1789, a coal pit was sunk at Halbeath, two and a half miles northeast of Dunfermline, and by 1821, 841 people were reported to be living in the village.

== Education ==
A school was built in Halbeath in 1875 under the School Board of the Parish of Dunfermline but was closed in 1966. A new primary school, Carnegie Primary, opened in Halbeath in August 2011. It was previously a virtual school which shared its campus with Inverkeithing Primary School.

Lauder Technical College was founded by Andrew Carnegie's uncle, George Lauder, Sr., father of George Lauder, Andrew's cousin and business partner, in 1899. The original campus was situated in the centre of Dunfermline before moving to Halbeath in 1970. The name was changed to Carnegie College in 2007. Carnegie College came together with Adam Smith College in August 2013 to form Fife College. There is also a Busy Bees nursery on the Carnegie College campus.

== Transport ==
The A92 road was extended in 1997, linking the roundabout at Carnegie College to the M90 motorway. This removed 22,000 vehicles a day from Main Street and Sandybank, the two busiest streets in Halbeath and greatly reduced congestion in the village.

Construction of the Halbeath Park & Ride started in late 2012 and opened on 25 November 2013. The construction was funded by the Scottish Government and European Regional Development Fund. The aims were to reduce congestion problems during the construction of the Queensferry Crossing, to provide alternative routes to Edinburgh and Glasgow and to reduce traffic in Dunfermline town centre. There have been calls to build a new railway station at the Park & Ride with the same aims as the Park & Ride. Currently, the nearest station is Dunfermline Queen Margaret railway station.

== Notes ==
- Pitcairn, Sheila (2000). History of the Old "Fitpaths" and Streets of Dunfermline, Then and Now, Also Crossford, Halbeath, Rosyth, Townhill & Wellwood. Dunfermline: Pitcairn Publications.
