= Abbeyview =

Housing estate in Dunfermline in Fife, Scotland

Coordinates: 56.0625°N 3.4019°W

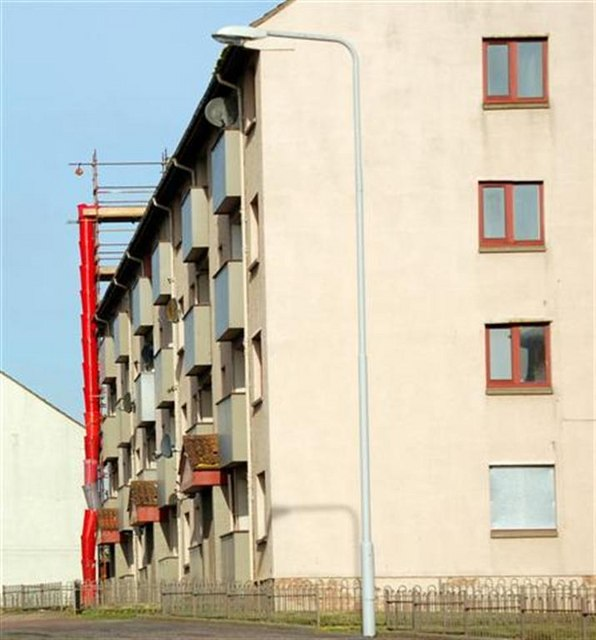
1960s flats awaiting renovation in 2008

Abbeyview is a housing estate in the city of Dunfermline in Fife, Scotland. It is situated in the east of the town, approximately 2 miles from the town centre. Most of the streets in the area are named after Scottish rivers and islands.

== Amenities ==
=== Shopping ===
There is a small shopping area around Abbey View, Allan Crescent, and Duncan Crescent, in the centre of the estate. It is home to newsagents, take-aways, hairdressers and Engraving Gift Shop . The nearest supermarkets are in the Duloch suburb. This area is home to both Aldi and Tesco supermarkets.

=== Schools ===
Lynburn Primary School is located on Nith Street near the centre of the estate, its catchment covers most of the area. It opened in the 1960s. Pitcorthie Primary School, which opened in 1954, was located on Aberdour Road to the south of the estate, it closed in July 2015. Woodmill High School is on Shields Road in the north of the estate. It serves the east of Dunfermline, as well as the coastal villages of Charleston, Limekilns, and North Queensferry. St. Columba's R.C. High School, Dunfermline is just outside the estate on Woodmill Road. It is a Roman Catholic school serving the western half of Fife.

=== Recreation ===
Next to the shopping district, surrounded by Allan and Duncan Crescents, is a large green area with artificial playing fields and children's play areas. Woodmill High School's community use also has many clubs on offer.

== Transport ==
=== Buses ===
The estate is served by Stagecoach in Fife services. The No5 is a circular service from the town centre via Touch and back to the city centre via Brucefield, while the 5A operates in the opposite direction, each operating every 20 minutes. The No3 runs Between Duloch - Abbeyview - Town Centre - Townhill, again every 20mins.

=== Rail ===
The nearest railway station is Dunfermline Town railway station to the east of the city centre which can easily be reached by the buses running to the city centre. The second station is Dunfermline Queen Margaret station situated near Queen Margaret Hospital.
