= Murray McCallum =

Scotland rugby union player (born 1996)

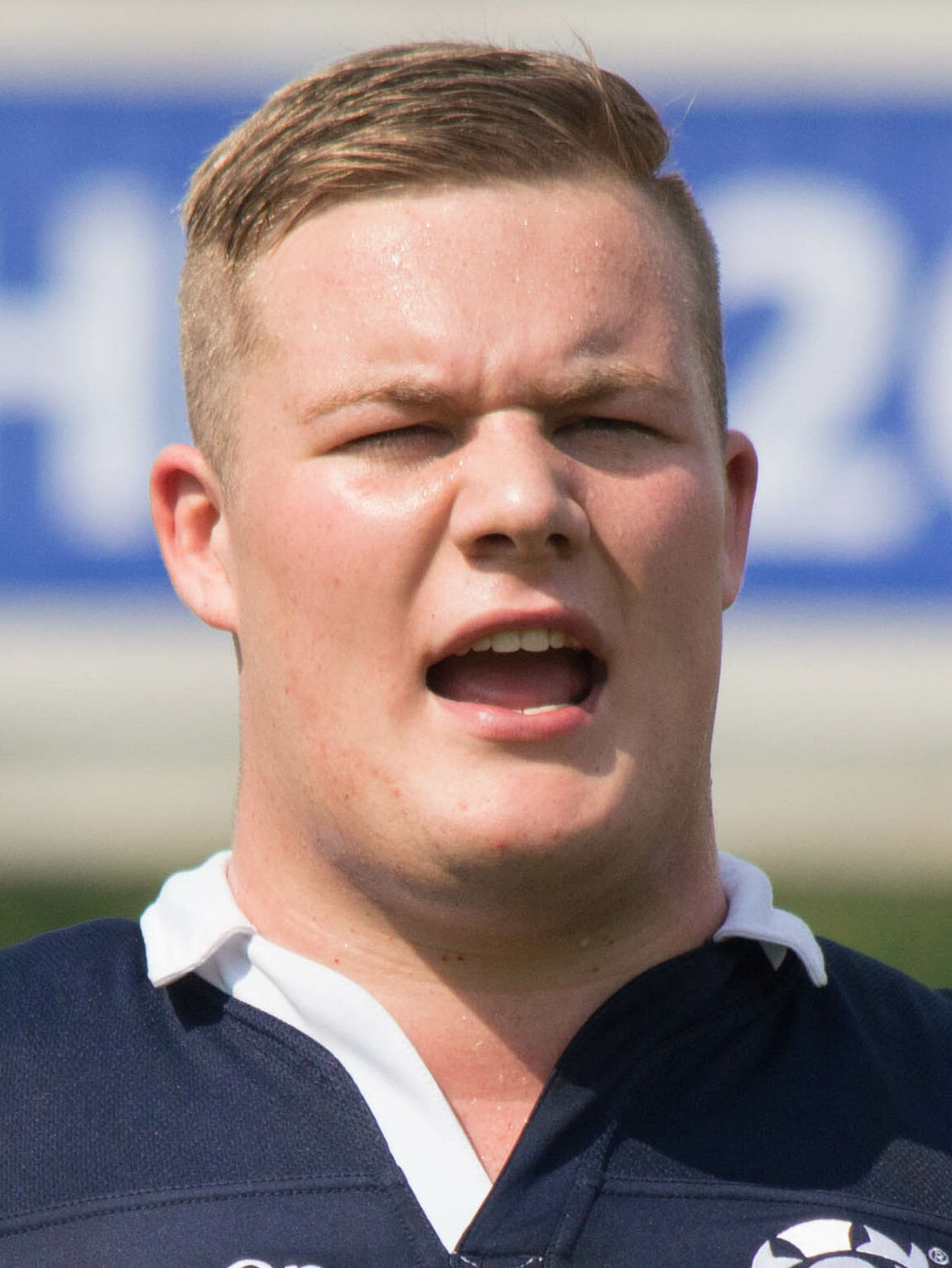
- McCallum in 2015
- Born: Murray McCallum; 16 March 1996 (age 30) Kirkcaldy, Scotland
- Height: 1.85 m (6 ft 1 in)
- Weight: 126 kg (19 st 12 lb)
- School: Woodmill HS, Strathallan
- University: University of Aberdeen

Rugby union career
- Position: Prop
Senior career
Years	Team	Apps	(Points)
2016–2021	Edinburgh Rugby	63	(20)
2021	Glasgow Warriors	4	(0)
2022	Worcester Warriors	18	(0)
2023	US Montauban	0	(0)
2023	Edinburgh Rugby	2	(5)
2023	→ Glasgow Warriors 'A'	1	(0)
2023–	Newcastle Falcons	49	(10)
- Correct as of 8 August 2025
International career
Years	Team	Apps	(Points)
2015–2016	Scotland U20	18	(25)
2018	Scotland	3	(0)
- Correct as of 6 April 2023

Murray McCallum (born 16 March 1996) is a Scottish rugby union player who currently plays for Newcastle Red Bulls in PREM Rugby.

== Rugby Union career ==
=== Amateur career ===
He played rugby union at Strathallan School and then for Dunfermline.

He was playing for Heriots at the time of his call up to the Edinburgh squad.

=== Professional career ===
He made his professional debut for Edinburgh Rugby in October 2016, as a substitute against Treviso.

When Heriots joined the Super 6, he was drafted to his old club, playing against the Southern Knights on 7 December 2019, and against Stirling County on 21 December 2019

On 15 July 2021 it was announced that McCallum had signed a short term deal with Glasgow Warriors.

He made his competitive debut for Glasgow in the 24 September 2021 match against Ulster away at Ravenhill Stadium in the United Rugby Championship, earning the Glasgow Warrior No. 333.

It was announced on 25 November 2021 that McCallum had signed a contract with Worcester Warriors which will start on 1 January 2022. The Worcester club went into administration after the 2022-23 season started, and their players were released.

McCallum signed a 10 day contract with Pro D2 side US Montauban.

On 13 January 2023, he re-signed with Edinburgh Rugby.

On 20 February 2023, McCallum returned to the Premiership with Newcastle Falcons on a two-year deal from the 2023-24 season.

=== International career ===
He played for the Scotland Under 20s in the 2016 World Rugby Under 20 Championship.

In January 2018 he was called up to the senior Scotland squad for the 2018 Six Nations Championship. He made his full senior debut from the bench, to play against Wales in the Six Nations.

== Outside of rugby union ==
While at University of Aberdeen he studied for a BSc in Geology and Petroleum Geology.
