= Banff and Macduff =

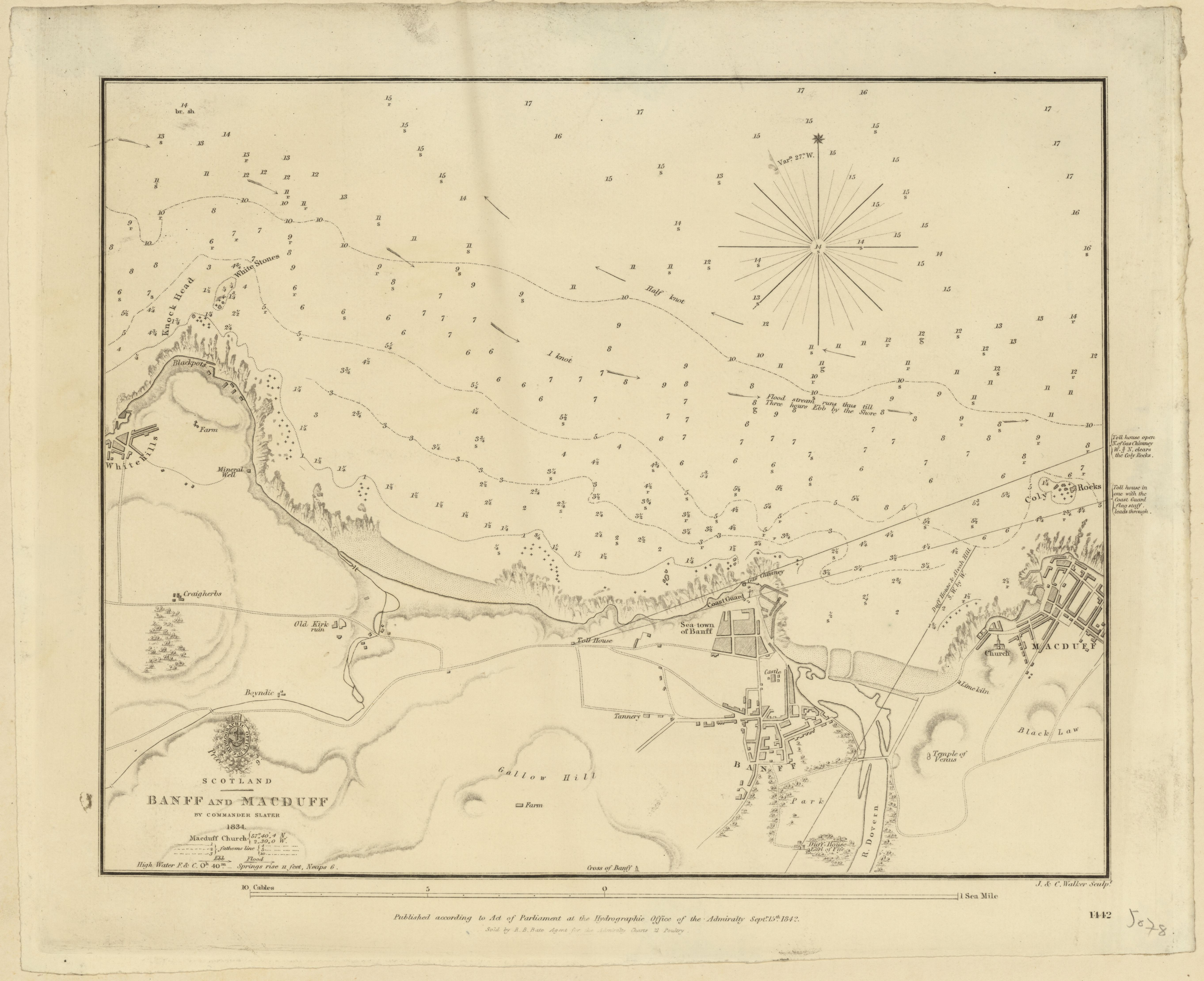
An 1842 map of Banff and Macduff

Banff and Macduff is a community council area in the Banff and Buchan committee area of Aberdeenshire, Scotland, with a community council. The community council area includes the two named towns and a rural area extending to the south west.

Banff and Macduff are two neighboring coastal towns on either side of the River Deveron, known for their intertwined history and long-established rivalry. They are often discussed together.

== History ==
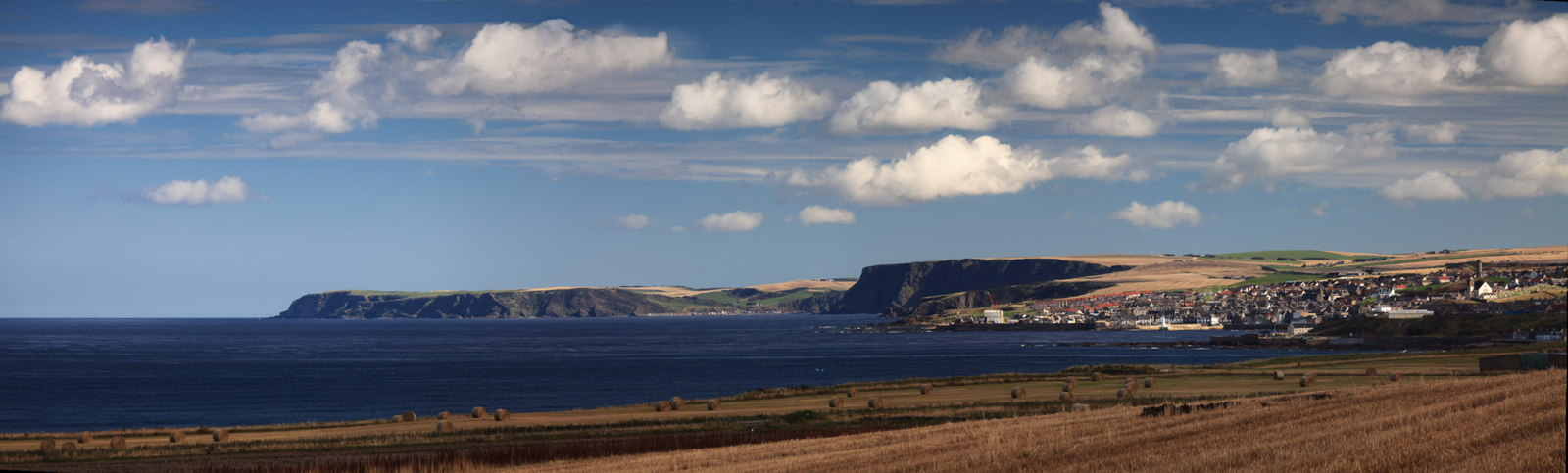
Banff and Macduff, as seen across the across Boyndie Bay

Banff and Macduff have historically both been fishing towns. The two towns have been home to herring fishermen.

The origins of their rivalry can be traced back to the hanging of Scottish outlaw and folk hero Jamie Macpherson. A messenger with a pardon was reportedly on the way through Macduff before his execution, but the people of Banff set their clock tower to an earlier time so that he would be hung before the messenger arrived. The people of Macduff were more favorable to Macpherson and the actions in Banff led to a rivalry between the towns. The rivalry has been covered in media including The Herald in Scotland and CBC Radio in Canada, among others.

In 1883, Banff and Macduff had a population of around 9,000. In 1906, the Duke of Fife gifted the Duff House to Banff and Macduff.

Banff and Macduff railway station operated from 1860 to 1872 on the Banff, Macduff and Turriff Junction Railway; it was renamed as Macduff (Banff) station in 1866. The 1950s saw opposition in Banff and Macduff to the closing of the passenger rail station.

In 2013, the two towns fought over the legal ownership of the bridge between them. A councillor from Banff argued that historic maps showed part of the land near the bridge belonged to Banff and was incorrectly claimed by Macduff. A new bridge linking the two towns was proposed in 2021.

The two towns share the Banff and Macduff Lifeboat Station and the Banff and Macduff Heritage Trail. An annual bowling competition has been held between the two towns for more than one hundred years.
