= Adam Smith College =

Scottish further and higher education college

- Motto: Inspiring Learning
- Type: College
- Active: 2005–2013
- Chancellor: Gordon Brown
- Location: Fife, Scotland
- Website: Official website

Adam Smith College was a Scottish further and higher education college located over various campuses across the county of Fife.

On 1 August 2013 Adam Smith College and Carnegie College came together to form Fife College, creating a new college for the region in line with Government legislation. The land-based elements of Scotland's Rural College, SRUC Elmwood College, were also incorporated in the new Fife College providing a wide range of courses to choose from.

== History ==
The college was formed on 1 August 2005 by the merger of Glenrothes College and Fife College and is named after Adam Smith, the founder of modern economics, who was born in Kirkcaldy. Smith's best known work is The Wealth of Nations. Before closure the college ran a range of NQ, HNC and HND courses. It also provided several degrees through Abertay University and a degree in Quantity Surveying from Heriot Watt University. The chancellor of the college before closure was Gordon Brown, the former prime minister.

== Campuses ==
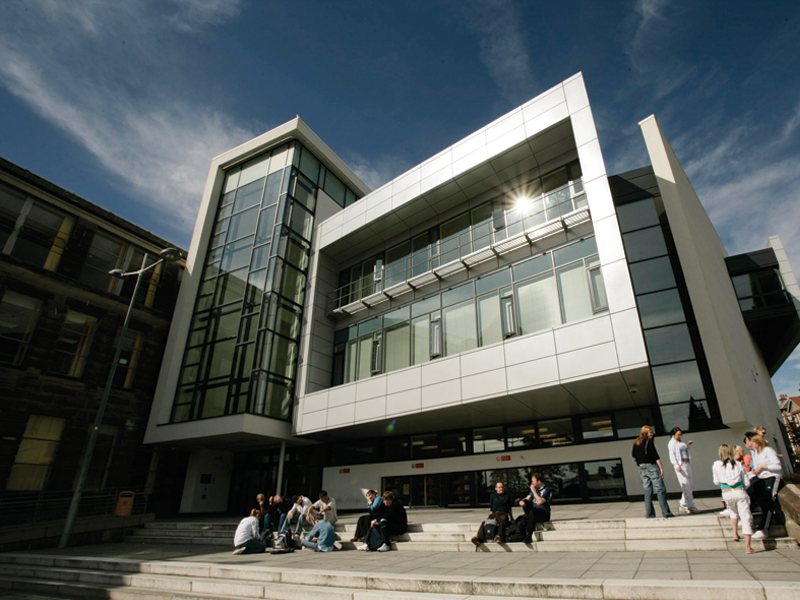
Adam Smith College, St Brycedale Campus, Kirkcaldy

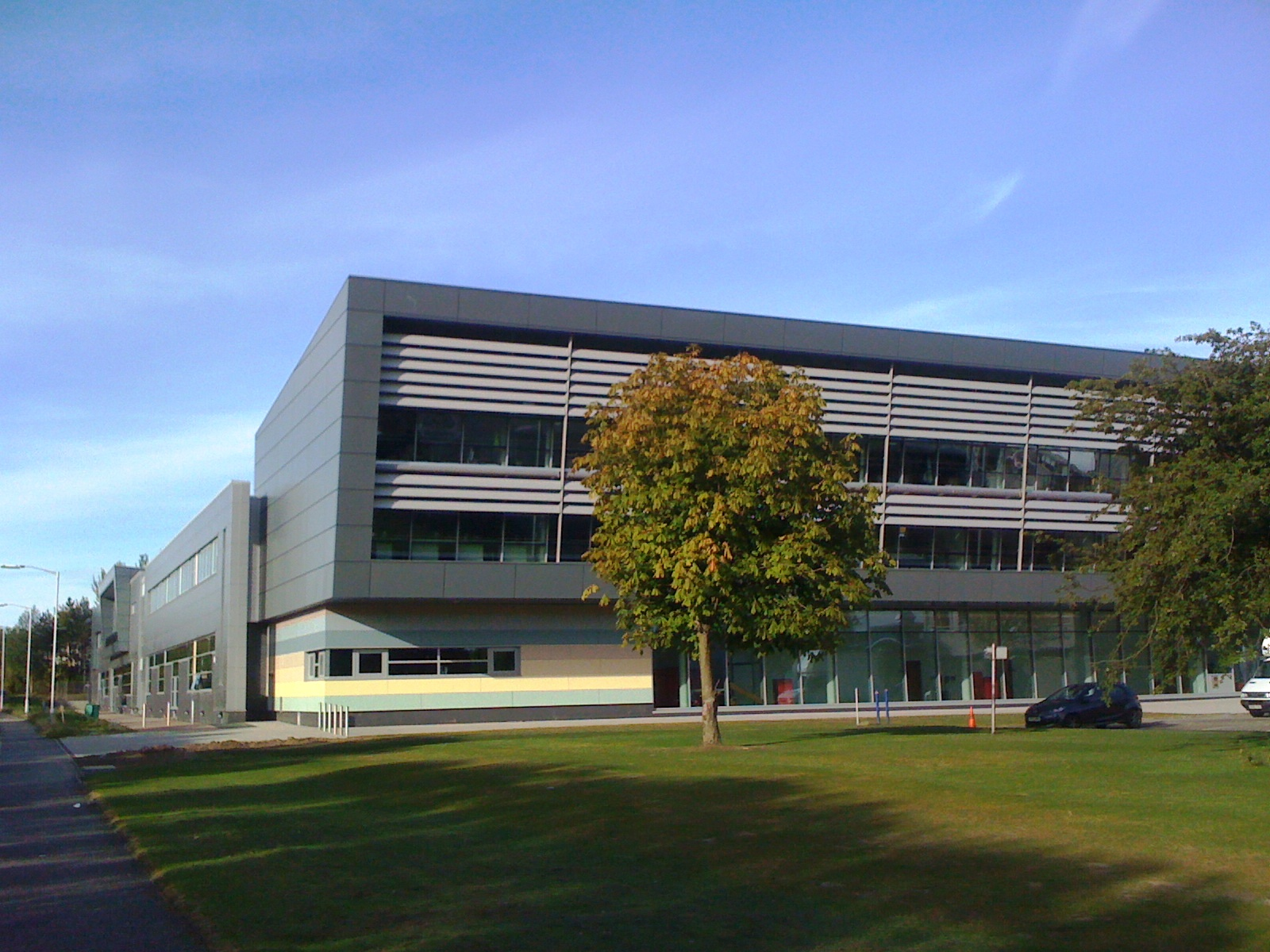
Adam Smith College, Stenton Campus, Glenrothes

The main campuses were St Brycedale (St Brycedale Avenue, Kirkcaldy) and Stenton (Stenton Road, Glenrothes).

Additional campuses were located at Levenmouth (Victoria Road, Leven), Lochgelly (Main Street, Lochgelly), Priory (Victoria Road, Kirkcaldy) and Southfield (Nasmyth Road, Glenrothes).

Outreach centres were located across Fife, including Anstruther, Bowhill and St Andrews.

== Courses ==
Adam Smith College offered a range of courses from introductory level through to degrees and professional qualifications.

Subject areas:

- Creative Industries
- Hair and Beauty
- Care and Social Sciences
- Sport and Fitness
- Tourism and Hospitality
- Languages and ESOL
- Business and Management
- Computing
- Engineering and Renewables
- Built Environment
- Science
- Skills for Life and Work

== Adam Smith Foundation ==
The Adam Smith Enterprise and Education Foundation, also known as the Adam Smith Foundation, was the charitable trust of Adam Smith College. The Foundation was established in 1997 to improve and extend opportunities for students.

Through partnership with businesses, charitable trusts and individual donors the Foundation developed a Scholarship Programme which provides recognition, a financial award, and in some cases, work experience and internships to support and encourage students to achieve their full potential.

All funds received from donors are transferred directly to the successful students and no money was retained by the college/foundation. These awards are used to provide direct assistance to students to support and augment their studies.

The Adam Smith Foundation has now become the charitable trust of Fife College.

== Adam Smith Lecture ==
The Adam Smith Lecture celebrates the life and work of Kirkcaldy's most famous son, Adam Smith – a leading figure of the Scottish Enlightenment and the father of modern economics.

The Adam Smith Lecture series has attracted prestigious national and international speakers including: Alan Greenspan KBE, who spoke while Chairman of the Federal Reserve in the US; and Sir Mervyn King, Governor of the Bank of England, both of whom were introduced by The Rt Hon Gordon Brown MP, former prime minister and last chancellor of the college. It is expected that Fife College will continue the lecture series.

Year	Guest speaker and lecture title
2013	Tom Devine – 'Adam Smith's Scotland'
2012	James Wolfensohn – 'A Turbulent World' followed by Dr Nicholas Phillipson – 'Adam Smith, The Man'
2011	Amartya Sen and Emma Rothschild – 'Scotland's Gift to the Global Society: Adam Smith – the Man and the Legacy'
2009	Kofi Annan – 'Global Economic Crisis and Africa: A Question of Values'
2006	Sir Mervyn King, Governor, Bank of England – 'Trusting in Money: From Kirkcaldy to the MPC'
2005	Alan Greenspan, former Chairman US Federal Reserve
2001	Rt Hon Michael Portillo MP – 'Is Business Responsible?'
2000	Morag Alexander, Director of the Equal Opportunities Commission in Scotland – 'Women at Work: A New Century of Progress'
1998	Rt Hon Gordon Brown MP, Chancellor of the Exchequer – 'Equality of Opportunity'
1995	Professor Richard Demarco – 'KUNST = KAPITAL ART = WEALTH'
1994	Professor Jack Straw CBE CA, Deputy Governor of The Bank of Scotland – 'Partnerships for Competitiveness'
1993	Professor Donald MacKay, Chairman Scottish Enterprise – 'An Economist Looks at Europe'
1992	Baroness Blackstone – 'How to Run Our Schools: Why the Government Should Think Again'
1990	Sir Donald Miller, Bicentennial Lecture
1989	Rt Hon The Lord Grimond – 'Wealth and Morals'
1988	Professor John Oakland, University of Bradford Management Centre – 'Total Quality Management'
1987	Professor Struther Arnott, Principal of St Andrews University – 'Industry Matters'
1986	Adam Smith Inaugural Lecture – Dr Tom Johnston, Principal of Heriot-Watt University and Chairman of Industry Year Scotland
1972	Adam Smith Symposium

== Adam Smith College Students' Association ==
The Adam Smith College Students’ Association organised campaigns and social activities and also provided support services and confidential help for College students.

The Students' Association caused controversy in 2005 when they rejected the name of Adam Smith, stating that "He is associated with socio-economic policies that work against the people, that were synonymous with Thatcherite and Reaganite governments". Instead they chose to use the name Jennie Lee Students’ Association, after a local socialist MP.

In April 2008, the students took the decision rename the association the Adam Smith College Students' Association.

== Controversy ==
In 2012 the college became embroiled in controversy amid claims of systemic abuse, bullying and victimisation of staff and students, and misappropriation of finances, by senior management. This led to internal investigations by the college's board of governors and vice principal of HR.

According to the Interested Parties of Adam Smith College (an anonymous group thought to be made up of college staff), the investigations recommendations for dismissal of two executive directors for the misappropriation of finances, were halted by the senior board staff. The senior staff of the board of governors were the principal, Dr. Craig Thomson, and the chairman of the board, Graham Johnstone.

Following this three board members, including the vice chair, resigned, as did the principal's secretary, the secretary of the board, and the vice principal of HR.

In response, the college's staff appealed to the Government Cabinet Secretary for Education Michael Russell to step in and act upon the findings of the investigations, and also suspend the principal and the board of governors, while a “transparent investigation by an independent third party” is carried out into their actions.

On 26 January 2012 the Interested Parties of Adam Smith College group launched the ItsOurCollegeNotCraigs website, which allowed staff and public to comment on the situation and sign a petition to the Government. The Government Minister David Torrance was one of the first to comment on the site, encouraging any staff to contact him in confidence.

From 26 January 2012 the agenda and minutes of the board since June 2011 were not available on the college's web site, which was a requirement of the Constitution and Standing Orders of the board of governors.

On 27 January 2012, after an emergency board meeting, the chairman of the board resigned.

On 28 January 2012 these events were reported in the national press,

Government Minister David Torrance confirmed that he had been inundated by complaints from staff for months regarding bullying, intimidation, and financial misappropriation, and that the board and staff resignations had occurred. He said “I have arranged a meeting with the Cabinet Secretary for Education Michael Russell to call on a full external enquiry into these allegations..”

An Adam Smith College spokesman confirmed that two executive directors were already being investigated, saying “These are being fully investigated and will comply with our official procedures."
