= McLean Primary School =

Location
- Baldridgeburn; Dunfermline, Fife, KY12 9EE; Scotland
- 56.076866°N 3.471686°W

Information
- Type: Non-denominational
- Established: 1842; 184 years ago
- Founder: Reverend Allan McLean
- Local authority: Fife Council
- Head teacher: Gillian Souter
- Age: 3 (nursery) to 12 (Primary 7)
- Enrolment: 378 with another 69 nursery
- Website: https://blogs.glowscotland.org.uk/fi/mcleanprimaryschool/

McLean Primary School is located in the centre of Dunfermline, Fife, Scotland. The head teacher is Gillian Souter Pupils from the school progress onto Queen Anne High School. The building is a category C listed building.

== History ==
McLean Primary School was first established in 1842 through a bequest by Reverend Allan McLean, a minister at Dunfermline Abbey. His bequest stated that the school was to ensure that education for working class children was to be provided at a low cost. In 1896, the school moved from Golfdrum Street to a new building in Baldridgeburn which was designed by Andrew Scobie and opened by Scottish-American entrepreneur, Andrew Carnegie. A ceremonial key from the school's opening is on show at Andrew Carnegie's Birthplace Museum, also in Dunfermline.

During the first world war, McLean school was used as an army barracks for soldiers stationed in Dunfermline. Air raid shelters were provided in the second world war and the students had ARP (Air Raid Precaution) training regularly. In the 1930s, the head teacher Norman Johnson helped pioneer the use of film in schools.

Extensions were made to the building between 1913 and 1915 and again in 1946. The original school building opened in 1896 is still in use today but was altered significantly in 1984 to modernise the interior. A new nursery was built in the northern part of the school grounds in 2000.

== Structure ==
McLean Primary School has thirteen classes from Primary 1 through to Primary 7 as well as separate nursery classes both in the mornings and afternoons.
