= List of listed buildings in Westerkirk, Dumfries and Galloway =

This is a list of listed buildings in the civil parish of Westerkirk in Dumfries and Galloway, Scotland.

== List ==
Name	Location	Date Listed	Grid Ref. (Note: Sometimes known as OSGB36, the grid reference (where provided) is based on the British national grid reference system used by the Ordnance Survey. • "Guide to National Grid". Ordnance Survey. • "Get-a-map". Ordnance Survey.)	Geo-coordinates	Notes	LB Number (Note: Historic Environment Scotland assign a unique alphanumeric identifier to each designated site in Scotland, for listed buildings this always begins with "LB", for example "LB12345".)	Image
Craig Farmhouse				55°11′09″N 3°02′11″W	Category C(S)	16927	Upload Photo
Hopsrig Farmhouse and Steading				55°11′15″N 3°03′54″W	Category B	16933	Upload Photo
Westerhall Farm (former Stables)				55°11′27″N 3°03′45″W	Category B	16937	Upload Photo
Bentpath Village, Westerkirk Old Churchyard, Johnstone Mausoleum				55°12′09″N 3°04′52″W	Category A	16921	Upload another image
Westerhall House				55°11′35″N 3°04′14″W	Category B	16936	Upload another image
Bentpath Village, Westerkirk Library				55°12′00″N 3°05′16″W	Category B	16940	Upload Photo
Burnfoot House with former Stable				55°11′19″N 3°02′40″W	Category B	49631	Upload Photo
Bentpath Village, Westerkirk Parish Church, retaining Wall And Gatepiers				55°12′08″N 3°04′58″W	Category B	16919	Upload another image
Bentpath Village, Westerkirk School and Schoolhouse				55°12′01″N 3°05′15″W	Category C(S)	16922	Upload Photo
Black Esk Bridge (Minor Road Over Black Esk)				55°12′19″N 3°10′36″W	Category C(S)	16924	Upload Photo
Craigcleuch House, North Lodge and Gatepiers				55°10′19″N 3°01′59″W	Category C(S)	16929	Upload Photo
Enzieholm Farmhouse				55°12′43″N 3°07′09″W	Category C(S)	16932	Upload Photo
Bentpath Village, The White House, Garden Wall and Gatepiers				55°12′10″N 3°04′56″W	Category B	16923	Upload Photo
Bentpath Village, Westerkirk Old Churchyard				55°12′08″N 3°04′58″W	Category B	16920	Upload Photo
Enzieholm Bridge (B709 over River Esk)				55°12′41″N 3°07′28″W	Category B	16931	Upload Photo
Westerhall, Bridge over Kirk Burn (Near Bentpath)				55°12′10″N 3°04′48″W	Category C(S)	16935	Upload Photo
Burnfoot Bridge				55°11′22″N 3°02′32″W	Category C(S)	16925	Upload Photo
Stennieswaterfoot				55°13′25″N 3°06′28″W	Category B	16934	Upload Photo
Burnfoot Farmhouse and Steading				55°11′28″N 3°02′53″W	Category B	16926	Upload Photo
Bentpath Village, Bentpath Bridge (Over River Esk)				55°12′06″N 3°04′59″W	Category A	16939	Upload another image
Bentpath Village, Telford Monument at Westerkirk Library				55°11′59″N 3°05′14″W	Category C(S)	16918	Upload another image
Craigcleuch House				55°10′17″N 3°01′53″W	Category B	16928	Upload Photo
Drove Knowe Monument to Sir F G Johnstone Of Westerhall				55°11′56″N 3°04′57″W	Category B	16930	Upload Photo
Westerhall House, North Lodge and Gatepiers				55°12′08″N 3°04′45″W	Category C(S)	16938	Upload Photo
Bentpath Village, Esk Cottage				55°12′05″N 3°05′00″W	Category C(S)	13907	Upload Photo

== Key ==
The scheme for classifying buildings in Scotland is:

- Category A: "buildings of national or international importance, either architectural or historic; or fine, little-altered examples of some particular period, style or building type."
- Category B: "buildings of regional or more than local importance; or major examples of some particular period, style or building type, which may have been altered."
- Category C: "buildings of local importance; lesser examples of any period, style, or building type, as originally constructed or moderately altered; and simple traditional buildings which group well with other listed buildings."

In March 2016 there were 47,288 listed buildings in Scotland. Of these, 8% were Category A, and 50% were Category B, with the remaining 42% being Category C.
