= Carnegie College =

Further education college in Scotland

Coordinates: 56.079°N 3.407°W

Carnegie College (formerly Lauder College) was a further education college based in Halbeath, Dunfermline, Fife, Scotland. It was established in 1899, with financial support from George Lauder and Andrew Carnegie and named after their father and uncle, respectively, George Lauder, Sr. In 2007, it was renamed Carnegie College in honour of Andrew Carnegie, Lauder's cousin, the steel magnate and philanthropist born in Dunfermline.

On 1 August 2013 Carnegie College and Adam Smith College came together to form Fife College, creating a new college for the region in line with Government legislation. The land-based elements of Scotland’s Rural College, SRUC Elmwood College, were also incorporated in the new Fife College providing a wide range of courses to choose from.

Before merging with Adam Smith, Carnegie College had around 11,000 students every year and offered over 350 programs at various levels, from introductory and national qualifications to higher national standards and degrees, delivered through a collegiate model of six schools.

== Description ==
The college was previously one of West Fife's largest employers and contributors to the local economy, employing almost 600 people with an annual turnover of £22 million. It was amongst the most financially independent colleges in Scotland, with just 45% of its funding coming from the Scottish Funding Council. Carnegie College was a statutory corporation and registered charity under Scottish law and in 2007-08 had a gross income of £23,991,000.

== Location ==
It was near the M90 motorway at the east end of Dunfermline and could be reached from most parts of Fife, Kinross-shire and Clackmannanshire. The college had smaller campuses throughout west Fife, including the former Royal Dockyard at Rosyth. It also worked in partnership with West Fife Enterprises, a local training initiative based in the West Fife Villages.

A report by Her Majesty's Inspectorate of Education gave the College a high standard of review. The College Review awarded seven grades of Very Good and one grade of Good, with special praise for access and inclusion, guidance, quality improvement and leadership. In the Subject Review there were grades of Very Good in every subject area, with outstanding success for Computing (7 Very Good), Art and Design (5 Very Good), Care (5 Very Good) and Science (4 Very Good).

== Name change ==
The college changed its name from Lauder College to Carnegie College in November 2007. The change of name was given formal approval by the Scottish Government on Friday 30 November 2007. Despite a high level of support, criticisms were raised and debate was held in the letters page of the Dunfermline Press. It is now known as the Dunfermline Campus of Fife College.

== See also ==
- List of further and higher education colleges in Scotland
