= Busy Bees Nurseries =

British childcare provider

Busy Bees Nurseries is a nursery group with 390 nurseries worldwide.

== History ==
Busy Bees was founded by Marg Randles in 1983 in Lichfield in England. It has subsequently acquired nursery chains such as Bush Babies, Leapfrog, Kids 1st, Just Learning, Kindercare, Tibbitots, and Caring Day Care.

The Ontario Teachers' Pension Plan acquired Busy Bees Nursery Group in October 2013, with Busy Bees management maintaining a significant minority share in the company. Busy Bees completed its first international acquisition in Southeast Asia with the purchase of 48 nurseries and Asia International College in Singapore along with a further 12 nurseries in Malaysia, the number of nurseries has now increased further to 52 in Singapore. Busy Bees also founded a childcare voucher company in 1998, which they later sold in 2008.

In 2017, Busy Bees acquired BrightPath Early Learning Inc. a Canadian early child care and educational facility provider.

In 2022 Boots partnered with Busy Bees, to offer its team members access to discounted childcare fees. In 2023, Sky partnered with Busy Bees to offer a workplace childcare solution to its working parents.

In 2023 Busy Bees expanded internationally with the acquisition of New Zealand-based Provincial Education Group and completed the acquisition of Australian childcare provider Think Childcare Group. It also acquired the Malvern Group in the United States, a network of 27 childcare centres in Pennsylvania and New Jersey.

== Education ==
Busy Bees nurseries in the United Kingdom are supported by learning programmes in line with the Early Years Foundation Stage Statutory Framework.

== Staff ==
In 2015 two of the founders of Busy Bees Nurseries were awarded an OBE for their longstanding service to the childcare sector. Margaret Randles is both the co-founder and chief academic officer.

In 2023, Gill Jones MBE — former deputy director for early years education at Ofsted — joined the group as group chief quality officer.
