= Fife College =

Educational institution in Fife, Scotland

- Type: College
- Established: 1 August 2013
- Principal: Jim Metcalfe
- Students: 21,000
- Location: Fife, Scotland, UK
- Website: www.fife.ac.uk

Fife College is a further and higher education college based in various towns across the region of Fife, Scotland.

== Campuses ==
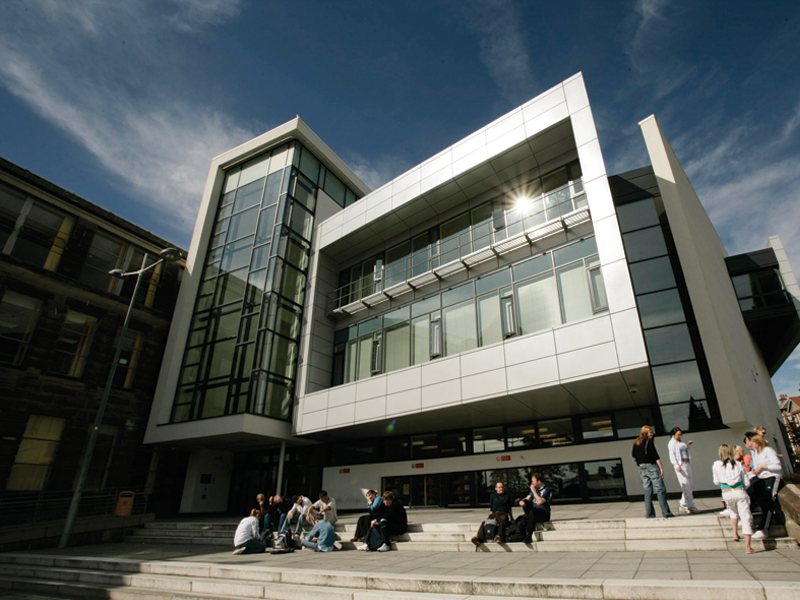
St Brycedale Campus, Kirkcaldy

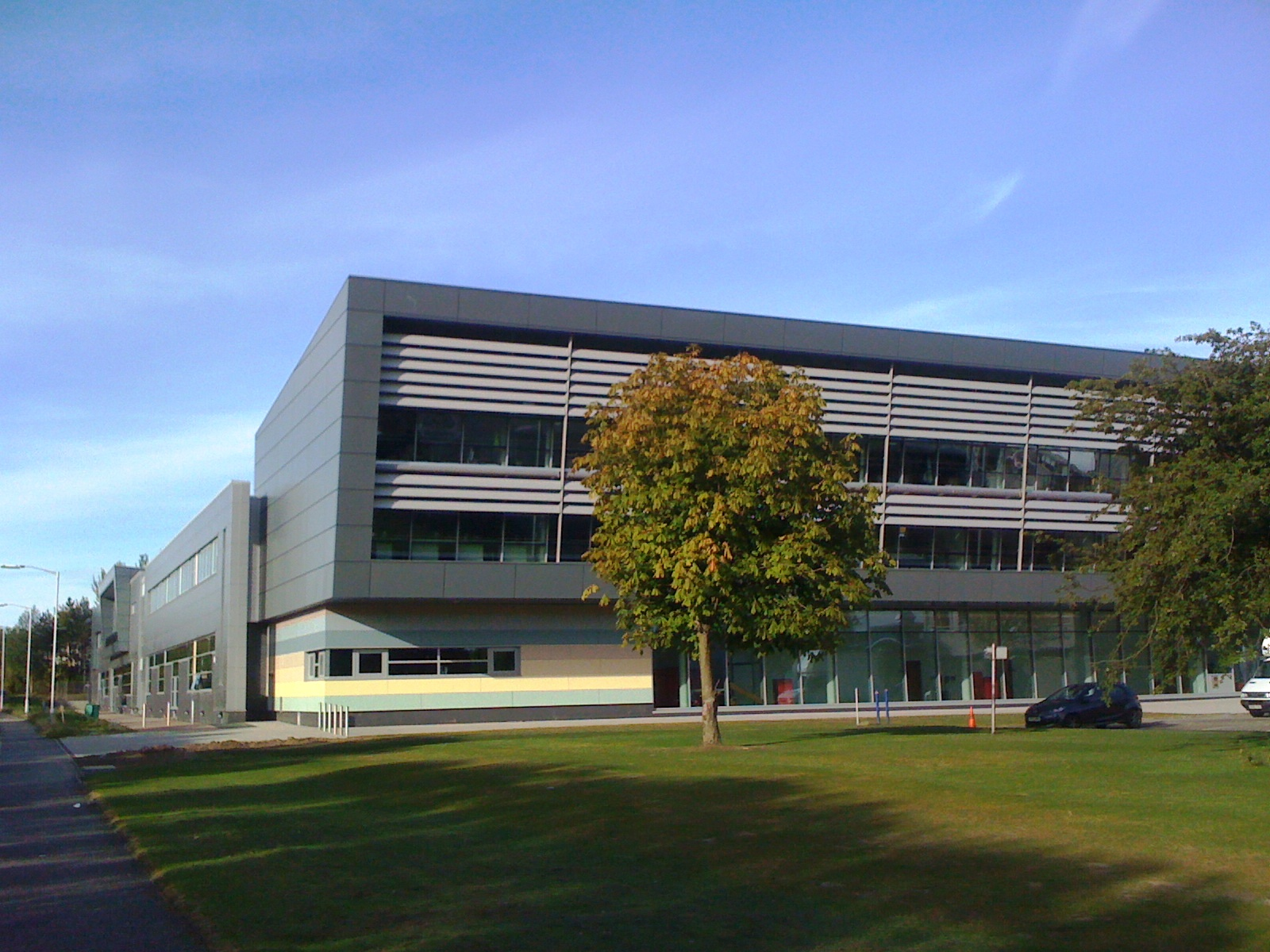
Stenton Campus, Glenrothes

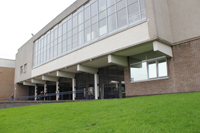
Halbeath Campus, Dunfermline

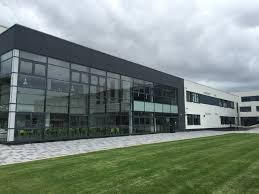
Levenmouth Campus, Leven

The college's main campuses are located in Dunfermline, Glenrothes and Kirkcaldy with smaller campuses in Leven, and Rosyth. The college also operates community learning centres across Fife.

== History ==
Fife College was created on 1 August 2013 as a merger of Adam Smith College, Carnegie College and non land based elements of the Elmwood Campus of the rural college SRUC. When the merger was announced in March of that year the new principal was named as Hugh Logan, formerly principal of Motherwell College. Following the retirement of Hugh Logan, Hugh Hall was appointed as principal, taking office on 1 March 2017. After six years in the role, Hugh Hall stood down to be replaced, in April 2023, by Jim Metcalfe, former Chief Executive at College Development Network.

In March 2016, the college announced that it had secured the option to purchase land at former Hyundai site in Dunfermline. The college plans to build a new campus on the site, which is expected to cost up to £130 million, with the new campus due to be open October 2025.

== Courses ==
The College delivers over 400 courses from introductory level to degree and post graduate studies. Courses are divided across 40 different subject areas, including:

- Administration and Office Technologies
- Art,| Design, Fashion and Jewellery
- Built Environment
- Business and Management
- Childcare
- Computing, Cyber and Digital Technologies
- Creative Media
- Culinary Arts
- Engineering and Energy
- English for Speakers of Other Languages
- Hair, Beauty and Makeup Artistry
- Health and Social Care
- Legal Services and Police Studies
- Performing Arts and Technical Theatre
- Science and Mathematics
- Sport and Fitness
- Tourism, Events and Customer Service

== Andrew Carnegie Business School ==
The Andrew Carnegie Business School at Fife College provides business, leadership and management training from certificate to postgraduate level and also a range of CPD qualifications.

== Adam Smith Scholarships ==
Adam Smith Scholarships is part of Fife College. It awards scholarships and has presented over 1800 scholarships to Fife College students worth almost £778,000 since it was created just over 20 years ago.

== Fife College Students' Association (FCSA) ==
FCSA is an autonomous, student-led, campaigning organisation, which provides services, representation and welfare support on behalf of students.

The day-to-day operation of The Association is fulfilled by the sabbatical officers, students who have finished college and work full-time for The Association.

== Boom Radio ==
Boom Radio is Fife College's student radio station. Its studios are also used to train students on broadcast media courses. Boom Radio was relaunched in December 2021 following refurbishment of its studios. It is controlled from the campus in Glenrothes.
