= Queen Anne High School, Dunfermline =

Queen Anne High School

Location
- Broomhead Parks; Dunfermline, Fife, KY12 0PQ; Scotland
- Coordinates: 56.0813°N 3.464°W

Information
- Type: Non-denominational
- Motto: Libertatem per Probitatem (Freedom by Integrity)
- Local authority: Fife Council
- Rector: Angela Robertson
- Age: 11 to 18
- Enrolment: 1600 as of June 2016
- Houses: Abbey, Bruce and Carnegie
- Colour
- Website: http://qahs.org.uk/

The main courtyard at the entrance to the school.

Queen Anne High School is a large secondary school in the city of Dunfermline in Fife. It is named for Anne of Denmark, the queen of James VI, whose former home was the school's original location.

In the 1930s it moved to the former Dunfermline High School building that lay to the north of Priory Lane. In the 1950s it moved again to a new campus at Broomhead, just to the south of its current location. In August 2003 it moved yet again 200 yards to the north, next to and encroaching upon the village of Wellwood.

In July 2014 the school was awarded the TES International Schools Award.

== Structure ==
The school (which is the second largest in Fife), is divided into three houses, Abbey, Bruce, and Carnegie (named after Dunfermline Abbey, Robert the Bruce and Andrew Carnegie). Former school houses which are no longer used include Denmark, Erskine and Fordell. Each house has a guidance team who are responsible for the pastoral care of the group of pupils who have been assigned to that particular house. As of 2016, the school's Rector is Mrs A Robertson.

== Role in the community ==
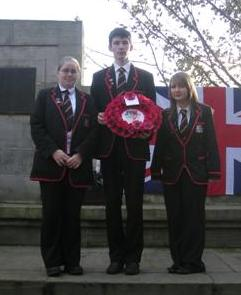
Queen Anne prefects at local community Remembrance Day service.

The school's facilities are open for use to the public after the school day finishes, these include a gym, sports hall, gymnastics hall, music studio, tennis courts and football pitches. Use of these facilities is managed by the Community Use Team

During the Festive Season, pupils donate food parcels to Sheltered Homes across Dunfermline and surrounding villages.

Queen Anne also plays a part in The Gambia with charity and fundraising to help fund expansion and improvement to the John Pickering Senior Comprehensive school located in the Gambia. From 2010, much of the fundraising has been put towards building a skills centre in the Gambian village of Jibboroh. The school also maintains a social link with the Gambian school as a number of pupils have formed penpals with those in Gambia. Also in 2006 some pupils went to visit the school in the Gambia and reported the project was a success. In 2007 two members of staff from John Pickering visited Queen Anne and there was a return trip of Queen Anne pupils to the Gambia mid-2008. A group of around ten pupils now visit The Gambia biennially in June for cultural exchange.

In March 2010, the Fife Area Confucius Classroom hub opened, based next to the LRC. This national initiative aims to support the learning of Chinese language and culture within Scottish schools. This initiative led to the Mandarin language being offered not only to S1-2 classes but also for SQA certification at Access level.

== Education ==
Queen Anne High School uses the Curriculum for Excellence.

== Notable alumni ==
- Maurice Malpas – Scottish international football player with the thirteenth most caps of all time
- Robert Archibald – Basketball player in the NBA, playing for Illinois and later the Memphis Grizzlies
- Peter Wishart - former member of rock bands Runrig & Big Country and later a Member of Parliament
- Deborah Knox – An Olympian who won Curling Gold at the 2002 Salt Lake City winter Olympics
- Fraser McKenzie – Professional rugby player
- Adam Nicol – Professional Rugby Player
