= St Columba's Roman Catholic High School, Dunfermline =

Coordinates: 56.0701°N 3.4186°W

St. Columba's R.C High School

Location
- Dunfermline Learning Campus, Old Muirhouses Road; Dunfermline, KY11 8WH; Scotland

Information
- Type: Secondary School
- Motto: "Tenui Nec Dimittam", which means, "I will hold and not let go"
- Religious affiliation: Roman Catholic
- Established: August 1969
- Head Teacher: Michael McGee
- Depute Head Teachers: Wendy Bricall; Karen Kelsey; Tracy Guildea; Ruairi Mulholland; Paddy Langan (Acting)
- Gender: Co-educational
- Age: 12 to 18
- Enrollment: 850 approx
- Houses: Mandela; Teresa; Romero
- Colours: Purple, Green, Yellow and Blue
- School years: S1-S6
- Diocese: St Andrews and Edinburgh
- Website: https://stcolumbas.greenhousecms.co.uk/

St Columba's RC High School is a six-year comprehensive Roman Catholic secondary school, located in Dunfermline in Fife, Scotland.

== History ==
The original St Columba's High School was opened in 1922 in Cowdenbeath as a combined Catholic senior secondary for all Fife pupils and a junior secondary for pupils from the immediate Cowdenbeath area. In 1959, the new St Andrew's High School in Kirkcaldy took on the role of the Catholic senior secondary and St Columba's became a junior high school with a catchment area covering Dunfermline and west Fife. The present school buildings were constructed in 1969, at which point the old junior high school in Cowdenbeath was closed. St Columba's celebrated its 40th anniversary in 2009.

Under Local Government reorganisation in 1973, authority for the running of St Columba's was transferred from the County Council to the newly formed Fife Regional Council. The school then developed into a six-year Catholic co-educational comprehensive school in line with the Education Authority policy.

The school tie with its Latin motto "Tenui Nec Dimittam", which means, "I will hold and not let go".

== Facilities ==
The subjects taught are split into different facilities each led by a principal teacher, most of which are taught through first and second year. Some subjects are only taught as National 5 or Higher and above. Subjects include:

- Mathematics (Maths, Numeracy)
- Languages (English, Literacy, Media, French, Spanish)
- Expressive & Performing Arts (Art, Music, Music Technology, and Drama)
- Social Subjects (Modern Studies, History, Geography, Childcare, Philosophy)
- Sciences (Chemistry, Biology, Physics)
- Religious Education
- Business & Hospitality Industry (Business & IT, Health and Food Technology)
- Health & Wellbeing (Physical Education, Dance)
- Technologies (Computing Science, Computing Games Development, Engineering, Practical Woodwork, Graphic Communication)

== Head teachers ==
- Jim Mooney: August 2009 - June 2016
- Kevin O'Connor: August 2016 - December 2020
- Michael McGee: January 2021 – Present

== Associated Primary Schools ==
- Holy Name RC Primary School, Oakley.
- St Bride's RC Primary School, Cowdenbeath.
- St John's RC Primary School, Rosyth.
- St Joseph's RC Primary School, Kelty.
- St Kenneth's RC Primary School, Ballingry. (Can also attend St Andrew's RC High School, Kirkcaldy)
- St Margaret's RC Primary School, Dunfermline.
- St Serf's RC Primary School, High Valleyfield.
- St Patrick's RC Primary School, Lochgelly. (Most pupils attend St Andrew's RC High School, Kirkcaldy)

== New Campus ==
A new Dunfermline Learning Campus which would accommodate St Columba's RC High School, Woodmill High School and Fife College's Halbeath Campus opened in August 2024.

Each school obtains their own identity and headteacher and shares certain facilities such as Dinning Space, Sport Halls, Assembly Hall and Social Spaces.

Fife College will have their own building within the site with security between the college and schools to ensure safety due to open in August 2025.

== Notable pupils ==
- Richard Jobson (b. 1960) - Singer-songwriter and filmmaker
- Alex Rowley (b. 1963) – Scottish Labour politician
- Gregory Burke (b. 1968) – playwright
- Natalie McGarry (b. 1981) – SNP Politician and former Member of Parliament for Glasgow East
- Jordan Patrick Smith (b. 1989) – Actor
