= Dunfermline Carnegie Library =

Library in Dunfermline, Scotland

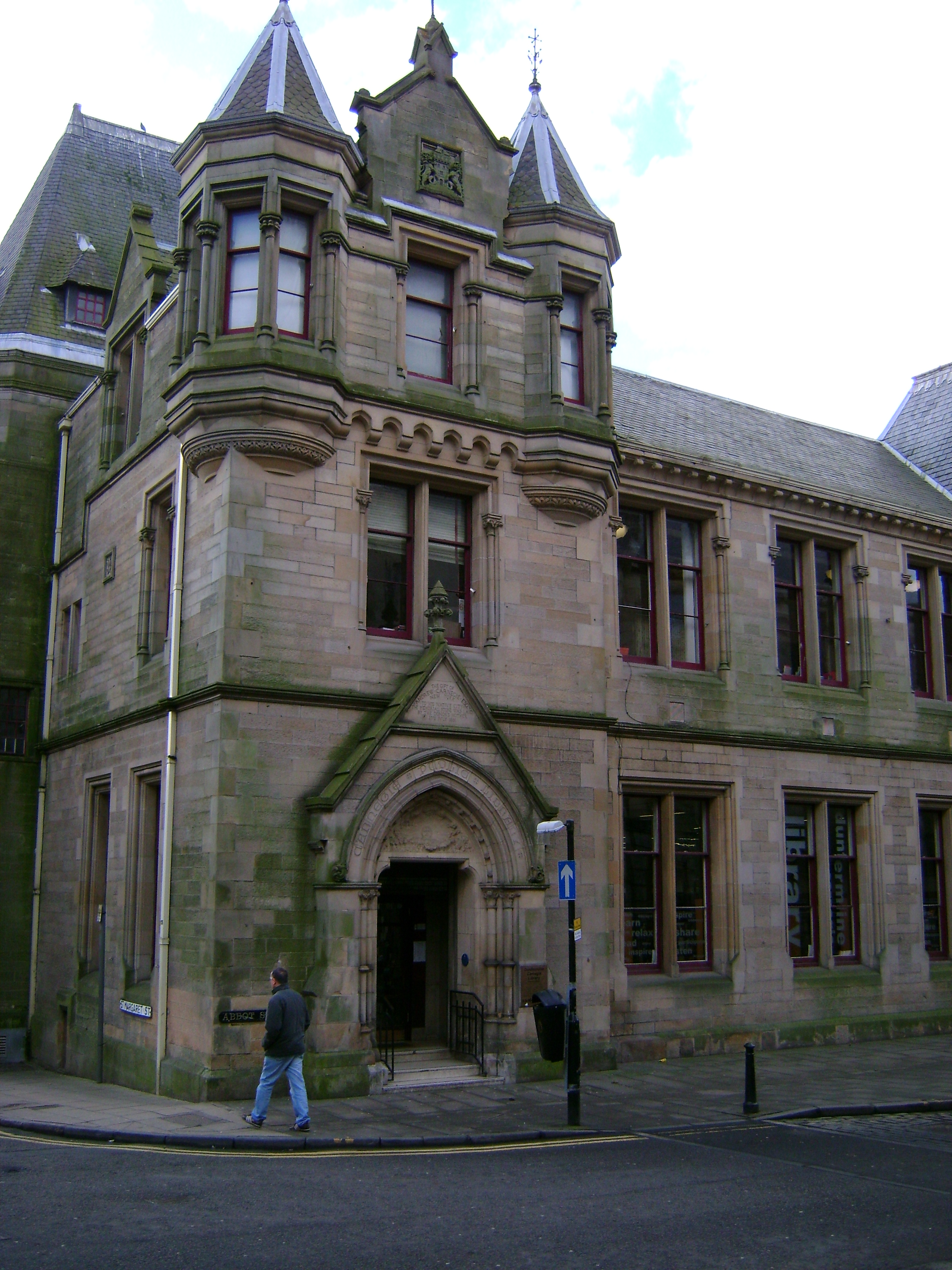
- Dunfermline Carnegie Library
- Interactive map of the Dunfermline Carnegie Library area

General information
- Type: Public library
- Architectural style: Domestic Tudor
- Location: Dunfermline, Scotland
- Coordinates: 56.0704°N 3.4620°W
- Construction started: 1881
- Completed: 29 August 1883

Design and construction
- Architect: James Campbell Walker

Website
- https://www.onfife.com/venues/dunfermline-carnegie-library

The Dunfermline Carnegie Library opened in Dunfermline, Scotland, on 29 August 1883 and was the world's first Carnegie Library funded by the Scottish-American businessman and philanthropist Andrew Carnegie. It was designed by Edinburgh architect James Campbell Walker who also designed the nearby Dunfermline City Chambers. Andrew Carnegie donated £8000 to building and stocking what would be the first of over 2,500 Carnegie Libraries. The library was made a Category B listed building in 1971.

== History ==
In 1879, Andrew Carnegie put plans in place to fund a new library for his birthplace, Dunfermline, Scotland. Building plans were prepared by James Campbell Walker in 1880, and on 27 July 1881 the foundation stone was laid by Carnegie's mother, Margaret Carnegie.

The opening of the library in 1883 was regarded as the most significant local event of the year and a public holiday was declared. The facilities included a library room, ladies' and gentlemen's reading rooms, a recreation room, a smoking room, and a flat for the librarian. The first librarian was Alexander Peebles, an Edinburgh bookbinder who was selected for the role from 250 applicants. The library proved to be a success however it was soon found to be too small, and the layout was unsuitable. To address these problems the newly formed Carnegie Dunfermline Trust took joint control of the library with the town council, and in 1904 began an extension, designed by James Shearer, which would more than doubled the size of the original building. As a result of the First World War the extension was not completed until 1922. After the extension was completed, full control of the library returned to the town council, with the Dunfermline Carnegie Trust contributing £400 a year to the library until 1958.

Another extension was added to the south of the building and was opened on 2 March 1993 which provided the library with new meeting and exhibition rooms, children and music libraries and a local history room.

In November 2017, the library was awarded the RIAS Andrew Doolan Best Building in Scotland Award.

== Archaeology ==
An archaeology dig called Dig Dunfermline took place over six weeks in August and September 2013 on the site of what is now Dunfermline's new museum and art gallery which connects to the library. There were several finds including a tile from a smokeless stove possibly from the 16th century, the foundations of a medieval building and leather fragments.

== Museum and art gallery ==
In spring 2014, the Dunfermline Carnegie Library was closed as part of the museum and art gallery project. The project was planned to take place over two years and cost £10.8 million with the library reopening in summer 2016. This was extended to spring 2017 and the cost rose to £12.4 million. It was designed by Scottish architect Richard Murphy and includes a museum spanning over two floors, a local studies centre, three exhibition galleries, a children's library and a cafe. The museum and art gallery opened on 18 May 2017.

== See also ==
- Andrew Carnegie
- Carnegie Library
- Dunfermline
- List of Carnegie libraries in Europe
- List of listed buildings in Dunfermline, Fife
