= North Church =

North Church or North Parish Church or variations may refer to:

== Church buildings ==
Netherlands

- The Noorderkerk in Amsterdam, the Netherlands, also known as North Church

Russia

- North Church (Alania), in Arkhyz, Karachay-Cherkessia

United Kingdom

- North Parish Church, Dunfermline, Scotland

United States

(by state)

- Old North Church (Sierra Madre, California)
- Old North Church in Boston, Massachusetts
- St. Stephen's Church, Boston, formerly New North Church, in Boston, Massachusetts
- North Parish Church (North Andover, Massachusetts)
- North Church, in Tupelo, Mississippi, whose North Church Primary School is listed on the NRHP in Mississippi
- North Church (Portsmouth, New Hampshire)
- North Church (Dumont, New Jersey), listed on the NRHP in New Jersey

== Religious denominations ==
- Danish Evangelical Lutheran Church in North America (also known as North Church), which merged in 1896 with the Danish Evangelical Lutheran Association in America to form the United Danish Evangelical Lutheran Church
