= List of listed buildings in Dunfermline, Fife =

This is a list of listed buildings in the parish of Dunfermline in Fife, Scotland.

== List ==
Name	Location	Date listed	Grid ref. (Note: Sometimes known as OSGB36, the grid reference (where provided) is based on the British national grid reference system used by the Ordnance Survey. • "Guide to National Grid". Ordnance Survey. • "Get-a-map". Ordnance Survey.)	Geo-coordinates	Notes	LB number (Note: Historic Environment Scotland assign a unique alphanumeric identifier to each designated site in Scotland, for listed buildings this always begins with "LB", for example "LB12345".)	Image
St Margaret's Drive, Dunfermline Public Park, Drinking Fountain				56°04′20″N 3°27′05″W	Category C(S)	45590	Upload another image
46-51 (Inclusive Numbers) Charlestown Village, (Double Row)				56°02′12″N 3°29′55″W	Category B	43647	Upload another image
Leys Park Road, Former Fever Hospital (Mclean House)				56°04′36″N 3°26′45″W	Category C(S)	26030	Upload another image
Leys Park Road, Former Poorhouse Probationary Ward ('The Lodge'), Including Gatepiers And Boundary Wall				56°04′32″N 3°26′51″W	Category C(S)	26031	Upload Photo
Bothwell Street, The Rhodes, Including Gatepiers To Bothwell Street				56°03′57″N 3°27′16″W	Category B	26044	Upload Photo
Garvock Hill (Corner Of Appin Crescent), Former North Lodge To Transy Estate, Including Railed Wall And Gatepiers To North And East				56°04′26″N 3°26′42″W	Category C(S)	26063	Upload another image
Kingseat Road, South Bellyeoman Farmhouse, Including Boundary Wall				56°05′03″N 3°26′10″W	Category B	26064	Upload Photo
East Port, Carnegie Hall Including Boundary Wall And Steps To North				56°04′19″N 3°27′13″W	Category B	26066	Upload another image See more images
80 Rose Street, Albany House Including Pavilions And Boundary And Garden Walls				56°04′34″N 3°27′13″W	Category B	26074	Upload Photo
Dunfermline Abbey, Nave				56°04′12″N 3°27′50″W	Category A	25960	Upload another image
Pittencrieff Park, Tower Bridge				56°04′11″N 3°28′04″W	Category B	25967	Upload another image
21 Maygate And Abbot Street, Abbot House, Including Gateways And Decorative Ironwork To East And West				56°04′14″N 3°27′46″W	Category A	25978	Upload another image
Abbot Street, Carnegie Library				56°04′13″N 3°27′43″W	Category B	25979	Upload another image
24-32 (Even Nos) Canmore Street				56°04′13″N 3°27′32″W	Category C(S)	25988	Upload Photo
5 Abbey Park Place, Including Boundary Walls				56°04′11″N 3°27′40″W	Category B	25995	Upload Photo
25-27 (Odd Nos) East Port				56°04′17″N 3°27′28″W	Category B	26012	Upload another image
Brucefield Avenue, St Leonard's Church (Church Of Scotland), Including Boundary Wall And Gatepiers And Church Hall To East				56°04′00″N 3°27′15″W	Category B	26024	Upload another image See more images
Limekilns, 3 Brucehaven Road, Viewforth Including Garden Wall				56°02′01″N 3°28′48″W	Category B	3727	Upload Photo
Limekilns, 4 Academy Square, Academy Cottage Including Garden Wall				56°02′05″N 3°29′01″W	Category B	3736	Upload Photo
Rosyth Old Kirk, Burial Ground, Mort House				56°01′46″N 3°28′11″W	Category B	3752	Upload another image
Limekilns, 8 The Wellheads, The Elms Including Boundary Wall, Outhouses And Hand Pump				56°02′02″N 3°28′43″W	Category C(S)	3753	Upload another image
Limekilns, Ramsay Lane, Murray House				56°01′59″N 3°28′50″W	Category B	3754	Upload another image
Pitliver House Including Estate Square, Tennis Pavilion, Polo Stables, Garden Walls And Gatepiers				56°02′58″N 3°30′31″W	Category B	3757	Upload Photo
Pitfirrane Castle Including Gatepiers				56°03′31″N 3°30′21″W	Category A	3759	Upload another image
Limekilns, 16 Halketshall, The Ship Inn				56°02′06″N 3°29′22″W	Category C(S)	3768	Upload another image
Dunfermline, Headwell Avenue, Headwell House Including Boundary Wall				56°04′49″N 3°27′13″W	Category B	3773	Upload Photo
Logie House Including Garden Wall, Greenhouse And Gatepiers				56°03′33″N 3°28′52″W	Category A	3776	Upload Photo
Limekilns, 9 Academy Square, Oriel House				56°02′05″N 3°29′03″W	Category C(S)	1644	Upload another image
Leckerstone Farmhouse Including Wall And Gatepiers				56°02′53″N 3°28′05″W	Category C(S)	1645	Upload Photo
Charlestown, Rocks Road, Old School				56°02′18″N 3°30′03″W	Category B	172	Upload another image
12 Abbey Park Place				56°04′12″N 3°27′32″W	Category C(S)	46877	Upload another image
95-101 (Odd Nos) Appin Crescent And 2-6 (Even Nos) Couston Street, Former Dunfermline Co-Operative Building				56°04′25″N 3°26′53″W	Category C(S)	46879	Upload Photo
Bothwell Street Railway Viaduct				56°04′00″N 3°27′19″W	Category B	46881	Upload another image
14-18 (Even Nos) Buchanan Street, Including Outhouse To Nw				56°04′08″N 3°27′38″W	Category C(S)	46882	Upload Photo
1 Canmore Street, St Margaret's Hotel				56°04′13″N 3°27′41″W	Category C(S)	46886	Upload Photo
12 Chapel Street				56°04′21″N 3°27′47″W	Category C(S)	46889	Upload Photo
Chisholm Street, Townhill Primary School, Including Gatepiers And Boundary Wall To N, S And W				56°05′28″N 3°26′17″W	Category C(S)	46890	Upload Photo
Dunfermline Abbey, Entrance Gateways And Boundary Walls And Railings, Including Toolhouse, To Abbey Nave And New Church				56°04′12″N 3°27′44″W	Category B	46893	Upload Photo
East Port, Pair Of Gatepiers To West Of Carnegie Hall At Nt 0952 8751				56°04′16″N 3°27′19″W	Category C(S)	46902	Upload Photo
Off Grange Road To West, Easter Gellet Farm, Original Courtyard-Plan Steading Including Farmhouse				56°03′05″N 3°27′04″W	Category C(S)	46908	Upload Photo
6-12 (Even Nos) New Row				56°04′17″N 3°27′31″W	Category C(S)	46924	Upload Photo
Phoenix Lane, Footbridge Over Former Stirling And Dunfermline Railway				56°04′32″N 3°28′14″W	Category C(S)	46928	Upload another image
Pittencrieff Park, South East Gateway, West Nethertown Street				56°03′59″N 3°27′42″W	Category C(S)	46936	Upload another image
Pittencrieff Park, West Gateway, Coal Road				56°04′08″N 3°28′16″W	Category C(S)	46941	Upload Photo
Queen Anne Street, Statue Of Ralph Erskine To South Of Former St Andrew's Erskine Church				56°04′20″N 3°27′38″W	Category B	46944	Upload Photo
Queensferry Road, Rosyth Parish Church (Church Of Scotland), Including Gatepiers And Boundary Wall				56°02′20″N 3°25′16″W	Category B	46945	Upload another image
Woodmill Road, Southwood, Including Garage				56°04′04″N 3°26′49″W	Category C(S)	46955	Upload Photo
Balmule Including Walled Garden, Coach House, Granary And Gatepiers				56°06′26″N 3°26′44″W	Category C(S)	47798	Upload Photo
7-12 (Inclusive Numbers) Charlestown Village, (North Row)				56°02′14″N 3°29′59″W	Category B	47808	Upload Photo
13-18 (Inclusive Numbers) Charlestown Village, (North Row)				56°02′14″N 3°29′57″W	Category B	47809	Upload Photo
31-33 (Inclusive Numbers) Charlestown Village (Cross Row) And 34-35 Charlestown Village, (Double Row)				56°02′13″N 3°29′50″W	Category B	47812	Upload Photo
40-45 (Inclusive Numbers) Charlestown Village, (Double Row)				56°02′13″N 3°29′54″W	Category B	47813	Upload Photo
73-78 (Inclusive Numbers) Charlestown Village, (South Row)				56°02′10″N 3°29′53″W	Category B	47818	Upload Photo
80-84 (Inclusive Numbers) Charlestown Village, South Row				56°02′10″N 3°29′57″W	Category B	47819	Upload Photo
Crossford, Main Street, War Memorial				56°03′50″N 3°29′43″W	Category C(S)	47827	Upload Photo
Priory Lane, Former High School Lodge, Including Gateposts And Boundary Wall To South/ South-East				56°04′07″N 3°27′33″W	Category C(S)	26027	Upload Photo
Primrose Lane, Primrose Farm Cottage				56°02′31″N 3°26′26″W	Category C(S)	26055	Upload Photo
Glen Bridge, Over Tower Burn				56°04′31″N 3°28′08″W	Category B	26072	Upload Photo
2-18 (Even Nos) Maygate				56°04′15″N 3°27′48″W	Category B	25977	Upload Photo
15 Abbey Park Place, Abbey Park House, Including Gateway, Boundary Wall, Railings And Lamp Standards				56°04′10″N 3°27′33″W	Category B	25994	Upload Photo
7-9 (Odd Nos) High Street				56°04′16″N 3°27′49″W	Category C(S)	26000	Upload Photo
15 East Port, Former Prudential Assurance Offices				56°04′18″N 3°27′29″W	Category B	26011	Upload Photo
44-46 (Even Nos) East Port, Robins Cinema				56°04′19″N 3°27′26″W	Category B	26015	Upload Photo
1-7 (Inclusive Nos) Queen's Court, Former Commercial School				56°04′15″N 3°27′22″W	Category B	26016	Upload Photo
Broomhall Policies, Courthill Cottage				56°02′34″N 3°30′03″W	Category B	3734	Upload Photo
Craigluscar Doocot Including Wall Flanking Driveway				56°06′03″N 3°30′14″W	Category C(S)	3739	Upload Photo
Charlestown, Fiddler's Hall				56°02′21″N 3°30′23″W	Category B	3761	Upload Photo
Limekilns, 11 And 13 Main Street				56°02′04″N 3°29′02″W	Category C(S)	3765	Upload Photo
Limekilns, 13 Halketshall				56°02′05″N 3°29′20″W	Category C(S)	3770	Upload Photo
1-6 (Inclusive Numbers) Charlestown Village (North Row)				56°02′15″N 3°30′04″W	Category B	1637	Upload Photo
8-14 (Even Nos) Bruce Street, Including The Bruce Tavern				56°04′17″N 3°27′50″W	Category C(S)	46287	Upload Photo
Baldridgeburn, Mclean Primary School, Including Gatepiers And Boundary Wall To South				56°04′37″N 3°28′18″W	Category C(S)	46880	Upload Photo
58 -62 (Even Nos) Buffies Brae				56°04′30″N 3°28′03″W	Category C(S)	46884	Upload Photo
Comely Park, To North West Of Nos 13-15, Edward Viii Post Box				56°04′06″N 3°27′16″W	Category B	46891	Upload another image
26-28 (Even Nos) Maygate				56°04′15″N 3°27′46″W	Category C(S)	46920	Upload Photo
Old Linburn Road To East, Entrance Gateway At No 43 (Formerly To Southfod House)				56°04′25″N 3°25′03″W	Category C(S)	46925	Upload Photo
Park Place, Barum House				56°04′15″N 3°26′49″W	Category C(S)	46926	Upload Photo
Pittencrieff Park, Summerhouse To North Of Tower Bridge				56°04′12″N 3°28′05″W	Category C(S)	46940	Upload Photo
St Leonard's Street, St Leonard's Primary School, Including Gateways, Railings And Boundary Wall				56°03′48″N 3°27′03″W	Category C(S)	46949	Upload Photo
Balmule Farm, Former Farmhouse				56°06′28″N 3°27′08″W	Category B	47799	Upload Photo
25-30 (Inclusive Numbers) Charlestown Village, (North Row)				56°02′14″N 3°29′52″W	Category B	47811	Upload Photo
62-66 (Inclusive Numbers) Charlestown Village, (Hall Row)				56°02′11″N 3°29′48″W	Category B	47816	Upload Photo
67-72 (Inclusive Numbers) Charlestown Village, (South Row)				56°02′10″N 3°29′51″W	Category B	47817	Upload Photo
85-90 (Inclusive Numbers) Charlestown Village, (South Row)				56°02′11″N 3°29′59″W	Category B	47823	Upload Photo
Colton House, Stables Including Walled Garden				56°05′38″N 3°27′46″W	Category C(S)	47825	Upload Photo
Limekilns, 12 Halketshall				56°02′05″N 3°29′20″W	Category C(S)	47833	Upload Photo
Limekilns, War Memorial				56°02′06″N 3°29′29″W	Category C(S)	47837	Upload another image
10 Forth Street To Rear, Former Nethertown Railway Bridge				56°03′53″N 3°27′44″W	Category C(S)	43674	Upload Photo
Leys Park Road, Former Dunfermline Poorhouse And Northern Hospital (Ley's Park Nursing Home), Including Gatepiers And Boundary Wall				56°04′34″N 3°26′48″W	Category B	26029	Upload Photo
6-8 (Even Nos) Pilmuir Street, Former Women's Institute				56°04′22″N 3°27′39″W	Category C(S)	26038	Upload Photo
Carnegie Drive, Dunfermline Fire Station				56°04′23″N 3°27′45″W	Category B	26042	Upload another image
Off Woodmill Road To North, Woodmill Bridge Over Lyne Burn				56°04′17″N 3°25′42″W	Category C(S)	26049	Upload Photo
Pattiesmuir, East Thorne Cottage				56°02′14″N 3°27′19″W	Category C(S)	26054	Upload Photo
16-18 (Even Nos) Douglas Street				56°04′19″N 3°27′39″W	Category C(S)	26071	Upload Photo
Pittencrieff Park, Dovecot				56°04′18″N 3°28′04″W	Category B	25971	Upload another image
Pittencrieff Park, Louise Carnegie Memorial Gateway, Including Detached Lamp Standards, Junction Of Bridge Street And Chalmers Street				56°04′16″N 3°27′59″W	Category A	25972	Upload another image See more images
4 Canmore Street, Former Burgh Of Dunfermline Gas Department				56°04′21″N 3°27′40″W	Category C(S)	25983	Upload another image
6 Canmore Street, Dunfermline Congregational Church, Including Boundary Wall				56°04′14″N 3°27′38″W	Category B	25984	Upload Photo
25 Canmore Street				56°04′13″N 3°27′37″W	Category B	25985	Upload Photo
High Street, Market Cross To North Of Guildhall Street				56°04′17″N 3°27′42″W	Category B	26003	Upload Photo
100 And 102 High Street				56°04′18″N 3°27′37″W	Category B	26008	Upload Photo
East Port, Holy Trinity Episcopal Church				56°04′18″N 3°27′20″W	Category B	26017	Upload another image
Viewfield Terrace, 3-8 (Inclusive Nos) Viewfield House				56°04′16″N 3°27′18″W	Category B	26019	Upload Photo
Limekilns, 2 And 3 Halketshall				56°02′05″N 3°29′11″W	Category C(S)	3730	Upload Photo
Limekilns, 8 Red Row, Seaview				56°02′00″N 3°28′52″W	Category C(S)	3748	Upload another image
Mid Mill Of Pitliver				56°02′51″N 3°30′14″W	Category C(S)	3760	Upload Photo
Limekilns, 8 Academy Square, The King's Cellar				56°02′06″N 3°29′02″W	Category A	1643	Upload another image See more images
7 Canmore Street				56°04′13″N 3°27′40″W	Category C(S)	46887	Upload Photo
East Port, Viewfield Baptist Church, Including Hall				56°04′18″N 3°27′22″W	Category B	46903	Upload another image
Elgin Street, Grange Bridge Over Lyne Burn				56°03′52″N 3°27′30″W	Category C(S)	46904	Upload Photo
Gardeners Street, Former Albany Works Office Building (Albany Business Centre), Including Gatepiers And Boundary Wall				56°04′28″N 3°27′21″W	Category C(S)	46906	Upload Photo
34 And 36 Garvock Hill				56°04′24″N 3°26′20″W	Category C(S)	46907	Upload Photo
Off Grange Road To West, Wester Gellet Farmhouse, Including Boundary Wall				56°02′55″N 3°27′28″W	Category C(S)	46909	Upload Photo
23 Guildhall Street				56°04′14″N 3°27′42″W	Category C(S)	46911	Upload Photo
Halbeath Road, Entrance Gateway To Dunfermline Cemetery, Including Cemetery Dividing Wall And Gateways To North West And Boundary Wall To Bellyeoman Road				56°04′39″N 3°26′32″W	Category C(S)	46912	Upload Photo
Hilton Road, 1-4 (Inclusive Nos) Hilton Cottages				56°02′05″N 3°27′19″W	Category C(S)	46915	Upload Photo
Pittencrieff Park, Bridge To West Of Tower Bridge				56°04′10″N 3°28′07″W	Category C(S)	46930	Upload Photo
Pittencrieff Park, Footbridge Over Tower Burn At Nt 0884 8733				56°04′13″N 3°27′57″W	Category C(S)	46933	Upload another image
Queensferry Road, Former St Leonard's Hill House, Including Entrance Gateway To South East				56°03′38″N 3°26′42″W	Category C(S)	46946	Upload Photo
Broomhall Policies, East Lodge Including Gatepiers				56°02′25″N 3°28′18″W	Category C(S)	47803	Upload Photo
19-24 (Inclusive Numbers) Charlestown Village, (North Row)				56°02′14″N 3°29′55″W	Category B	47810	Upload Photo
Colton House Including Sundial And Gatepiers				56°05′36″N 3°27′49″W	Category C(S)	47824	Upload Photo
Keavil House Hotel				56°03′31″N 3°30′05″W	Category C(S)	47829	Upload Photo
Leckerstone Farm				56°02′54″N 3°28′04″W	Category C(S)	47830	Upload Photo
Lochhead				56°05′59″N 3°28′36″W	Category C(S)	47839	Upload Photo
St Margaret's Drive, Dunfermline Public Park, Bandstand				56°04′12″N 3°27′04″W	Category B	45589	Upload another image
Milepost, A823, North West Of Outh				56°08′18″N 3°31′01″W	Category C(S)	45591	Upload Photo
33 East Port				56°04′18″N 3°27′26″W	Category B	43886	Upload Photo
34 Queen Anne Street				56°04′19″N 3°27′42″W	Category B	26033	Upload Photo
42-44 (Even Nos) Queen Anne Street, Head Post Office, Including Former Stable Yard And Boundary Wall				56°04′20″N 3°27′41″W	Category B	26034	Upload Photo
Bothwell Street, Former St Leonard's Works Warehouse And Office Block (Erskine Beveridge Court), Including Entrance Piers To West				56°03′55″N 3°27′09″W	Category B	26045	Upload Photo
Off Old Mill Court, Brucefield House				56°03′56″N 3°26′44″W	Category B	26046	Upload Photo
Off Woodmill Road To North, Woodmill Farmhouse, Including Attached Outbuilding To West				56°04′17″N 3°25′42″W	Category C(S)	26047	Upload Photo
Pittencrieff Park, Telephone Kiosk To West Of Pittencrieff House				56°04′08″N 3°28′09″W	Category B	26067	Upload another image
Pittencrieff Park, Statue Of Andrew Carnegie				56°04′16″N 3°28′06″W	Category B	25970	Upload another image
5-7 (Odd Nos) Abbot Street				56°04′13″N 3°27′44″W	Category B	25980	Upload Photo
33 Canmore Street, Alhambra Bingo Hall				56°04′11″N 3°27′29″W	Category B	25991	Upload Photo
11 Abbey Park Place				56°04′11″N 3°27′37″W	Category B	25996	Upload Photo
New Row, Comely Park House, Including Boundary Wall, Walled Garden And Outhouses To North				56°04′10″N 3°27′25″W	Category C(S)	26022	Upload Photo
New Row, Comely Park House Sundial				56°04′09″N 3°27′24″W	Category B	26023	Upload Photo
Limekilns, Kiln North Of 12 And 14 Main Street				56°02′05″N 3°28′59″W	Category C(S)	3728	Upload Photo
Limekilns, 10 Halketshall				56°02′06″N 3°29′19″W	Category B	3737	Upload Photo
Limekilns, 1 Brucehaven Road, The Gables Including Garden Wall				56°02′02″N 3°28′47″W	Category B	3738	Upload Photo
Broomhall Including Garden Balustrade, Kitchen Court Walls Larder And Stables				56°02′14″N 3°28′59″W	Category A	3745	Upload Photo
Broomhall, Ice-House And Summer-House				56°02′10″N 3°29′06″W	Category B	3746	Upload Photo
Limekilns, 11 Halketshall				56°02′05″N 3°29′19″W	Category B	3747	Upload Photo
Crossford, 57 And 59 Main Street				56°03′48″N 3°29′53″W	Category C(S)	3758	Upload Photo
Limekilns, 26 Main Street Including Boundary Wall				56°02′05″N 3°29′03″W	Category B	3764	Upload Photo
2-8 (Even Nos) Abbot Street				56°04′14″N 3°27′42″W	Category B	46878	Upload Photo
Monastery Street (South Side), World War I Memorial				56°04′08″N 3°27′48″W	Category C(S)	46921	Upload Photo
7 Nethertown Broad Street, Former Nethertown Institute (Dell Farquharson Community Leisure Centre)				56°03′59″N 3°27′27″W	Category C(S)	46923	Upload Photo
Pittencrieff Park, Pittencrieff Lodge And Gateway (Pittencrieff Street)				56°04′18″N 3°28′11″W	Category C(S)	46935	Upload Photo
123 Rose Street, Including Walled Yard To North				56°04′37″N 3°27′07″W	Category C(S)	46947	Upload Photo
Rumblingwell, Milesmark Primary School, Including Boundary Wall				56°04′43″N 3°29′00″W	Category C(S)	46948	Upload Photo
Walmer Drive (East Side), Former Villa To South Of And Forming Part Of Fife Council Housing Service				56°04′16″N 3°27′25″W	Category C(S)	46953	Upload Photo
56-59 (Inclusive Numbers) Charlestown Village, (Lochaber)				56°02′13″N 3°29′46″W	Category B	47814	Upload Photo
1 Moodie Street, Old Kirk House (Former Abbey Church Manse), Including Gateway And Boundary Wall				56°04′04″N 3°27′44″W	Category B	26028	Upload Photo
Queen Anne Street, Former Saint Andrew's Erskine Church, Including Boundary Wall				56°04′21″N 3°27′37″W	Category B	26035	Upload Photo
Limekilns Road, Remains Of Windmill To East Of Hill House				56°03′26″N 3°27′36″W	Category B	26051	Upload Photo
Off Grange Road To West, Blackhall Farmhouse				56°02′37″N 3°27′06″W	Category B	26052	Upload Photo
5-11 (Odd Nos) Douglas Street				56°04′18″N 3°27′40″W	Category C(S)	26070	Upload Photo
Pittencrieff Park, Pittencrieff House, Including Parapet Wall To North				56°04′09″N 3°28′02″W	Category A	25968	Upload Photo
11 Guildhall Street, Former Employment Exchange Building				56°04′15″N 3°27′43″W	Category C(S)	25998	Upload Photo
81-85 (Odd Nos) High Street And 4 Guildhall Street, Former Guildhall				56°04′16″N 3°27′41″W	Category A	25999	Upload another image See more images
38 High Street				56°04′17″N 3°27′45″W	Category C(S)	26006	Upload Photo
1-3 (Odd Nos) East Port, Former Bank Of Scotland				56°04′17″N 3°27′31″W	Category B	26010	Upload another image
East Port, St Margaret's Roman Catholic Church				56°04′21″N 3°27′17″W	Category B	26018	Upload another image
2-4 (Even Nos) Moodie Street And 5 Priory Lane, Andrew Carnegie Birthplace Memorial, Including Boundary Walls And Railings				56°04′05″N 3°27′40″W	Category B	26026	Upload Photo
Rosyth Old Kirk Including Burial Ground And Boundary Wall				56°01′47″N 3°28′10″W	Category B	3751	Upload Photo
South Fod House Including Gatepiers				56°04′30″N 3°24′31″W	Category B	3774	Upload Photo
Broomhall, Limekilns, 9 The Old Orchard Garden, Broomhall Doocot				56°02′06″N 3°28′51″W	Category B	1639	Upload Photo
Limekilns, 10 Church Street, Manse And Boundary Wall				56°02′04″N 3°28′50″W	Category B	1641	Upload Photo
Charlestown, Rocks Road, Former Estate Workshop, Scottish Lime Centre				56°02′15″N 3°30′03″W	Category C(S)	207	Upload Photo
Golfdrum Street, North Parish Church (Church Of Scotland)				56°04′31″N 3°28′08″W	Category C(S)	45779	Upload another image See more images
13 Abbey Park Place				56°04′11″N 3°27′36″W	Category C(S)	46876	Upload Photo
5-7 (Odd Nos) East Port, Including East Port Bar				56°04′17″N 3°27′31″W	Category C(S)	46896	Upload Photo
Monastery Street (North Side), World War II Memorial				56°04′10″N 3°27′47″W	Category C(S)	46922	Upload another image
Priory Lane, Dunfermline Bowling Club Pavilion, Including Boundary Wall				56°04′06″N 3°27′35″W	Category C(S)	46943	Upload Photo
60-61 Charlestown Village, (Hall Row)				56°02′11″N 3°29′47″W	Category B	47815	Upload Photo
Limekilns, 6 Dunfermline Road, The Old School House Including Boundary Wall				56°02′06″N 3°28′39″W	Category C(S)	47831	Upload Photo
Limekilns, Dunfermline Road, Limekilns Primary School Including Boundary Wall				56°02′08″N 3°28′35″W	Category C(S)	47832	Upload Photo
Limekilns, 3 Warrington Court				56°02′04″N 3°28′55″W	Category C(S)	47838	Upload Photo
Logie House, Lodge And Gatepiers				56°03′52″N 3°29′23″W	Category C(S)	47843	Upload Photo
Milepost, A823, South Of Muirside				56°05′57″N 3°27′56″W	Category C(S)	47845	Upload Photo
Wester Craigduckie Farmhouse Including Gatepiers And Wall				56°06′26″N 3°26′20″W	Category C(S)	47846	Upload Photo
Pilmuir Street, Victoria Works (Castleblair Ltd), Including Boundary Wall To South And West				56°04′32″N 3°27′37″W	Category B	26041	Upload Photo
Limekilns Road, Hill House, Including Walled Garden And Two Pairs Of Gatepiers To West				56°03′29″N 3°27′37″W	Category A	26050	Upload Photo
Pattiesmuir, Ingleneuk And Ingleside				56°02′14″N 3°27′17″W	Category C(S)	26053	Upload Photo
East Port, Carnegie Music Institute				56°04′19″N 3°27′12″W	Category B	26065	Upload Photo
3-13 (Odd Nos) Bruce Street				56°04′17″N 3°27′51″W	Category C(S)	26068	Upload Photo
28-34 (Even Nos) Bruce Street				56°04′19″N 3°27′49″W	Category C(S)	26069	Upload Photo
Dunfermline Abbey, New Abbey Parish Church, Church Of Scotland				56°04′12″N 3°27′50″W	Category A	25961	Upload Photo
3 Bridge Street, City Chambers				56°04′15″N 3°27′51″W	Category A	25973	Upload another image See more images
27 Canmore Street				56°04′13″N 3°27′36″W	Category B	25986	Upload Photo
29 Canmore Street				56°04′13″N 3°27′34″W	Category B	25987	Upload Photo
25 High Street				56°04′16″N 3°27′47″W	Category B	26001	Upload another image
125 High Street				56°04′16″N 3°27′36″W	Category C(S)	26002	Upload Photo
82 High Street And 1 Douglas Street				56°04′18″N 3°27′40″W	Category B	26007	Upload Photo
104-106 High Street				56°04′18″N 3°27′36″W	Category B	26009	Upload Photo
35-41 (Odd Nos) East Port, Including Railings				56°04′18″N 3°27′25″W	Category B	26013	Upload Photo
43-45 (Odd Nos) East Port, Century House				56°04′18″N 3°27′24″W	Category B	26014	Upload another image
60 New Row, British Legion Club (Front Building)				56°04′13″N 3°27′27″W	Category B	26020	Upload Photo
Limekilns, 7 Halketshall				56°02′06″N 3°29′17″W	Category C(S)	3731	Upload Photo
Brucehaven Farmhouse Including Garden Wall				56°02′07″N 3°27′41″W	Category C(S)	3732	Upload Photo
Charlestown, 8, 10, 14, The Sutlery, 16, 18 Rocks Road, Including Letterbox				56°02′16″N 3°30′03″W	Category B	3742	Upload Photo
Limekilns, 11 Academy Square, Hope Cottage				56°02′05″N 3°29′03″W	Category B	3763	Upload Photo
Limekilns, 5 Halketshall				56°02′06″N 3°29′15″W	Category B	3767	Upload Photo
Limekilns, 14A, 14B Halketshall, Kingcraig, 15 Halketshall, Somervail Including Garden Wall				56°02′06″N 3°29′21″W	Category B	3769	Upload Photo
Craigluscar House Including Garden Walls				56°06′03″N 3°30′13″W	Category C(S)	3772	Upload Photo
22-24 (Even Nos) Buchanan Street, Including Outhouse To Nw				56°04′07″N 3°27′37″W	Category C(S)	46883	Upload Photo
5 Guildhall Street, Somewhere Else				56°04′16″N 3°27′42″W	Category C(S)	46910	Upload Photo
53 And 55 High Street				56°04′16″N 3°27′44″W	Category C(S)	46913	Upload Photo
Pittencrieff Park, East Gateway, St Catherine's Wynd, Including Boundary Wall				56°04′12″N 3°27′53″W	Category B	46932	Upload Photo
Broomhall Policies, Former Brick Works, Drying Shed And Chimney				56°02′29″N 3°29′24″W	Category C(S)	47804	Upload Photo
Craigduckie Cottage				56°06′36″N 3°25′48″W	Category C(S)	47826	Upload Photo
Dunfermline, Broomhead Mews Including Gatepiers				56°04′45″N 3°27′50″W	Category C(S)	47828	Upload Photo
Limekilns, Main Street, K6 Telephone Kiosk				56°02′03″N 3°28′58″W	Category B	47834	Upload Photo
Rosyth Dockyard, Power Station (Building No 333)				56°01′31″N 3°26′46″W	Category B	50783	Upload Photo
Rosyth Dockyard, Barham Road, Signal Box At Nt 10953 82170				56°01′27″N 3°25′49″W	Category C(S)	50785	Upload Photo
30-32 (Even Nos) Queen Anne Street, Including Railings And Gatepiers To West				56°04′19″N 3°27′43″W	Category B	26032	Upload Photo
Chapel Street, Gillespie Memorial Church, (Church Of Scotland), Including Boundary Wall And Gatepiers To West				56°04′21″N 3°27′45″W	Category C(S)	26037	Upload Photo
65 Inglis Street And Pilmuir Street, Carnegie Clinic				56°04′26″N 3°27′37″W	Category B	26040	Upload Photo
Hilton Road, Hilton Farmhouse				56°02′05″N 3°27′05″W	Category B	26056	Upload Photo
Off Queensferry Road, Pitreavie Castle				56°02′54″N 3°25′06″W	Category A	26058	Upload another image
Pilmuir Street, And Returns To Foundry Street And Cousins Lane, Pilmuir Works, Including Gatepiers And Boundary Wall To West				56°04′27″N 3°27′43″W	Category A	26073	Upload another image
32-36 (Even Nos) Bridge Street				56°04′17″N 3°27′56″W	Category C(S)	25974	Upload Photo
13-15 (Odd Nos) Kirkgate, The Old Inn				56°04′15″N 3°27′52″W	Category C(S)	25976	Upload another image
2 Canmore Street				56°04′14″N 3°27′41″W	Category B	25982	Upload Photo
66 High Street				56°04′17″N 3°27′42″W	Category B	26004	Upload Photo
60-64 High Street, Clydesdale Bank				56°04′17″N 3°27′43″W	Category B	26005	Upload Photo
Off Reid Street To E, Priory House, Formerly Dunfermline And West Fife Hospital Nurses' Home				56°04′00″N 3°27′26″W	Category B	26025	Upload Photo
Broomhall Policies, Hillock				56°02′29″N 3°28′22″W	Category C(S)	3735	Upload Photo
Charlestown, Camsie House Including Ancillary Buildings And Garden Wall				56°02′13″N 3°30′17″W	Category B	3740	Upload Photo
Charlestown Village, The Queen's Hall				56°02′11″N 3°29′46″W	Category B	3743	Upload Photo
Charlestown, Saltpans, Easter Cottage Including Boundary Wall				56°02′08″N 3°29′52″W	Category B	3744	Upload Photo
Limekilns, Brucehaven Road Forth Cruising Club, Club House Including Boundary Wall				56°01′54″N 3°28′40″W	Category B	3749	Upload Photo
Charlestown, Bridge Of Former Elgin Railway				56°02′13″N 3°30′25″W	Category B	3755	Upload another image
Charlestown Harbour				56°02′06″N 3°30′02″W	Category B	3756	Upload Photo
Dunfermline, Broomhead House Including Balustraded Wall				56°04′45″N 3°27′50″W	Category B	3775	Upload Photo
Logie House, Steading				56°03′41″N 3°29′06″W	Category A	3777	Upload Photo
Broomhall, Limekilns, 9 The Old Orchard Including Outhouse				56°02′05″N 3°28′51″W	Category B	1638	Upload Photo
31 Canmore Street				56°04′12″N 3°27′29″W	Category C(S)	46888	Upload Photo
58-64 (Even Nos) East Port, Lorne House				56°04′19″N 3°27′22″W	Category C(S)	46901	Upload Photo
Foundry Street, St Margaret's Works (Castleblair Ltd)				56°04′31″N 3°27′44″W	Category B	46905	Upload another image
78-80 High Street				56°04′18″N 3°27′40″W	Category C(S)	46914	Upload Photo
6 Kirkgate, Tappie Toories				56°04′15″N 3°27′49″W	Category C(S)	46916	Upload Photo
Parkgate, Former Rosyth Institute (Parkgate Community Leisure Centre)				56°02′22″N 3°25′07″W	Category C(S)	46927	Upload Photo
58-73 (Inclusive Nos) Skibo Court, Former High School, Including Gateway To Buchanan Street				56°04′07″N 3°27′33″W	Category B	46951	Upload another image
Woodmill Road, Brucefield Manor Hotel				56°04′08″N 3°26′28″W	Category C(S)	46954	Upload Photo
Charlestown, Iron Mill Road, Towers				56°02′30″N 3°30′43″W	Category C(S)	47805	Upload Photo
Charlestown, 12 Rocks Road, The School House Including Boundary Wall				56°02′17″N 3°30′00″W	Category C(S)	47807	Upload Photo
Limekilns, Sandilands Lane, Wellhead House Including The Neuk And Garden Wall				56°02′03″N 3°28′44″W	Category C(S)	47836	Upload Photo
Milesmark, Elgin Cottage Including Greenhouse, Boundary Wall And Gatepiers				56°04′53″N 3°29′46″W	Category C(S)	47844	Upload Photo
19, 21, 23 Kirkgate				56°04′14″N 3°27′51″W	Category B	49094	Upload Photo
Rosyth, Hms Caledonia, Figurehead Of Admiral Duncan				56°01′56″N 3°26′53″W	Category C(S)	50979	Upload Photo
42 Pilmuir Street, Carnegie Leisure Centre				56°04′27″N 3°27′38″W	Category B	26039	Upload Photo
Pitreavie Castle, Dovecot To North East				56°02′56″N 3°25′01″W	Category B	26059	Upload another image
St John's Drive, Garvock House Hotel, Including Boundary Wall And Gatepiers				56°04′17″N 3°26′36″W	Category B	26062	Upload Photo
26-30 (Even Nos) Bridge Street				56°04′17″N 3°27′55″W	Category C(S)	25975	Upload Photo
26-28 (Inclusive Nos) Guildhall Street				56°04′15″N 3°27′41″W	Category C(S)	25997	Upload Photo
85 New Row, Wilson's Institution				56°04′10″N 3°27′28″W	Category B	26021	Upload Photo
Limekilns, Sandilands, Forth Cottage				56°02′02″N 3°28′47″W	Category C(S)	3726	Upload Photo
Limekilns Harbour, Limekilns Pier				56°02′01″N 3°29′10″W	Category C(S)	3729	Upload Photo
Gallowridge Hill Farmhouse And Granary				56°03′16″N 3°28′31″W	Category B	3733	Upload Photo
Limekilns, Brucehaven Harbour, Capernaum Pier				56°01′51″N 3°28′43″W	Category C(S)	3750	Upload Photo
Limekilns, 16 Main Street, Green Island (Formerly Sunnyside), Including Garden Wall				56°02′05″N 3°29′01″W	Category C(S)	3762	Upload Photo
Dunnygask Farmhouse				56°07′12″N 3°30′51″W	Category C(S)	3771	Upload Photo
Limekilns, Church Street, Limekilns Parish Church (Church Of Scotland) And Boundary Wall				56°02′03″N 3°28′51″W	Category B	1640	Upload Photo
Limekilns, 6 Main Street, Brewstead				56°02′04″N 3°28′58″W	Category B	1642	Upload Photo
Former Viaduct To East Of Buffies Brae At Nt 0888 8786				56°04′31″N 3°28′02″W	Category C(S)	46885	Upload another image
Douglas Street, The Commercial Inn				56°04′19″N 3°27′40″W	Category C(S)	46892	Upload Photo
Pittencrieff Park, Music Pavilion And Cafeteria, Including Terraced Seating To North				56°04′09″N 3°28′12″W	Category B	46934	Upload Photo
39 Priory Lane, Former Masonic Lodge				56°04′05″N 3°27′35″W	Category B	46942	Upload Photo
1-57 (Inclusive Nos) Skibo Court, Former Lauder Technical College				56°04′07″N 3°27′31″W	Category B	46950	Upload another image
33 Townhill Road				56°04′35″N 3°27′01″W	Category C(S)	46952	Upload Photo
Bowleys				56°07′12″N 3°27′11″W	Category C(S)	47800	Upload Photo
Charlestown, K6 Telephone Kiosk				56°02′12″N 3°30′03″W	Category B	47806	Upload Photo
Rosyth Dockyard, Pumping Station (Building No 500)				56°01′27″N 3°26′48″W	Category B	50784	Upload Photo
Hospital Administration Block, Lynebank Hospital, Halbeath Road, Dunfermline				56°04′41″N 3°24′49″W	Category B	52192	Upload Photo
Bruce Street Hall, 37-39 Bruce Street (former drill hall administration block) excluding hall to rear, Dunfermline				56°04′20″N 3°27′51″W	Category C(S)	52373	Upload another image
No. 2 Gasholder and No. 3 Gasholder, excluding tank and shells to No. 2, sunken tank and inner shells to No. 3 and any telemetry, pipework or other items that connect to the gasholders above or below ground and excluding all other structures and buildings on the gasworks site, Grange Road, Dunfermline				56°03′39″N 3°27′29″W	Category B	52444	Upload another image

== Key ==
The scheme for classifying buildings in Scotland is:

- Category A: "buildings of national or international importance, either architectural or historic; or fine, little-altered examples of some particular period, style or building type."
- Category B: "buildings of regional or more than local importance; or major examples of some particular period, style or building type, which may have been altered."
- Category C: "buildings of local importance; lesser examples of any period, style, or building type, as originally constructed or moderately altered; and simple traditional buildings which group well with other listed buildings."

In March 2016 there were 47,288 listed buildings in Scotland. Of these, 8% were Category A, and 50% were Category B, with the remaining 42% being Category C.

== See also ==
- List of listed buildings in Fife
