= Dunfermline Guildhall =

Judicial building in Dunfermline, Scotland

The Guildhall
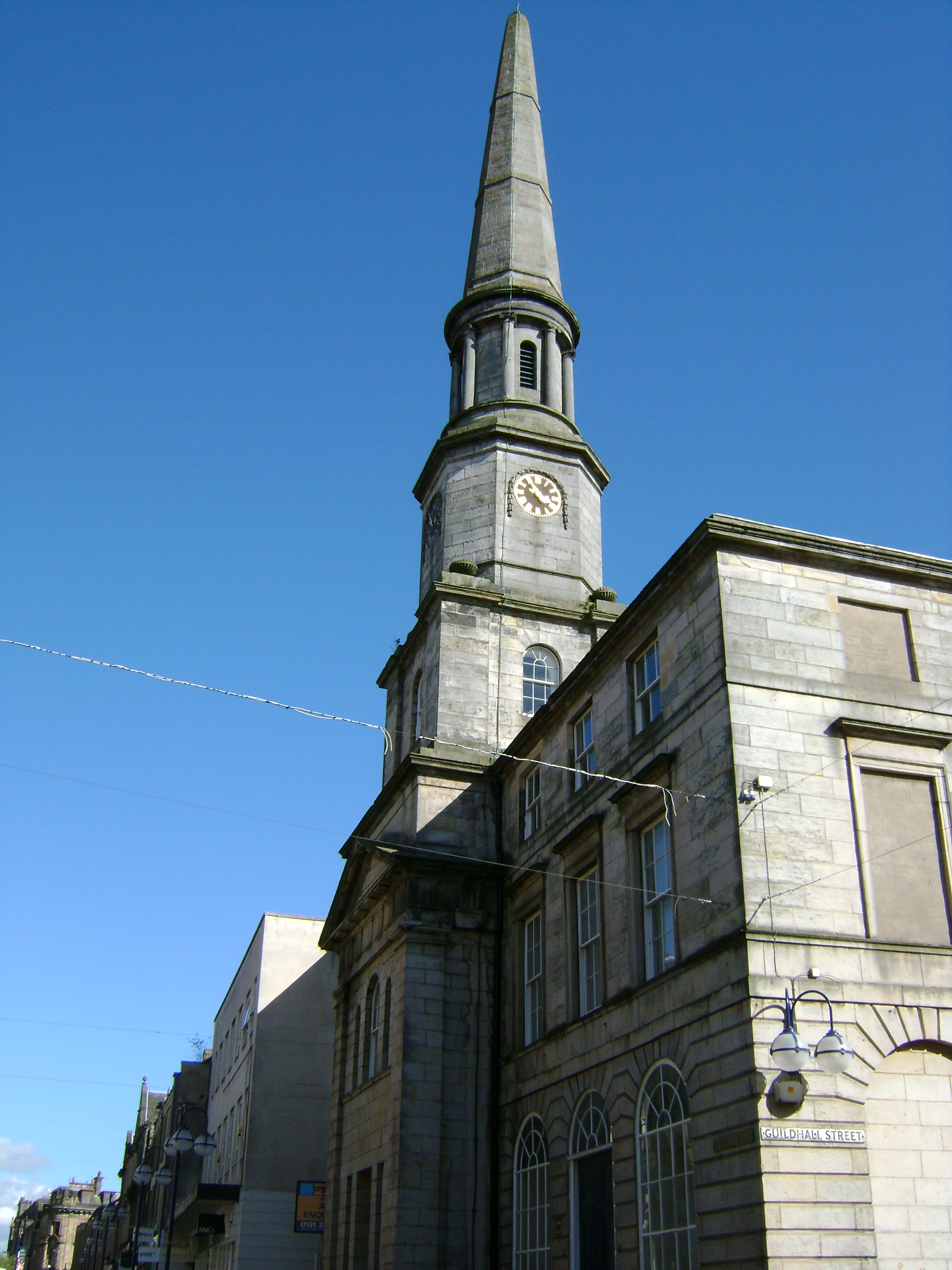
- The building in 2009

- Shown in Fife
- 56.0712°N 3.4614°W
- Location: High Street, Dunfermline

History
- Built: 1811

Site notes
- Architect: Archibald Elliot
- Architectural style: Neoclassical style

Listed Building – Category A
- Official name: 81–85 (Odd Nos) High Street and 4 Guildhall Street, former Guildhall
- Designated: 12 January 1971
- Reference no.: LB25999

The Guildhall, also known as The Guildhall & Linen Exchange, is a historic building on the High Street in Dunfermline in Scotland. The structure, which currently operates as a public house, is a Category A listed building.

== History ==
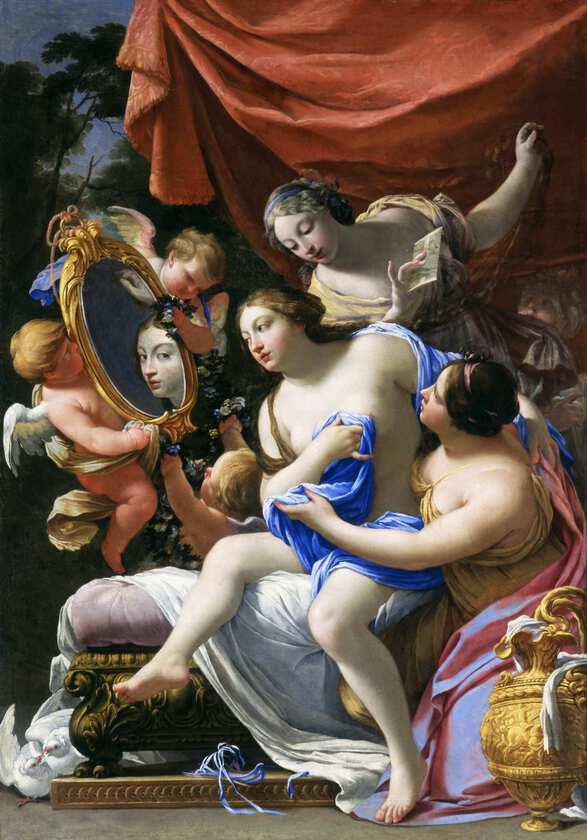
The Toilet of Venus by Simon Vouet

The building was commissioned in July 1807 by the guilds of the local merchants who wanted Dunfermline to become the county town of Fife. The site they selected was on the south side of the High Street, close to the mercat cross. The new building was designed by Archibald Elliot in the neoclassical style, built in ashlar stone and was completed in 1811.

The design involved a symmetrical main frontage of seven bays facing onto the High Street. The central bay, which was slightly projected forward, featured a square-headed doorway with a fanlight flanked by a pair of lancet windows on the ground floor, and a Venetian window on the first floor, all flanked by two pilasters supporting an entablature with triglyphs and a modillioned pediment. Behind the pediment, there was a three-stage clock tower with round headed windows in the first stage, a octagonal section with clock faces in the second stage and an octagonal section with louvred openings and Ionic order columns in the third stage, all supporting a spire. The whole structure was 130 feet (40 m) high. The wings of three bays each were fenestrated by round headed windows on the ground floor, square headed sash windows with cornices on the first floor and small square windows on the second floor. Internally, the principal room was the main assembly hall, which featured two fine ceiling panels, one entitled Venus Lamenting the Death of Adonis by Benjamin West, and the other entitled The Toilet of Venus by Simon Vouet. These were later taken down and were subsequently acquired by the Carnegie Museum of Art.

The guildhall initially operated as a linen hall, allowing local merchants to trade the linens which were made in the local mills. It was then converted to become the "Spire Inn" in 1817, and operated as a public house for three decades before becoming the home of the Dunfermline Sheriff Court as "County Buildings" in 1850. It remained the main courthouse for the area for over a century, until 1983, when court officials decided to relocate to a modern courthouse in Carnegie Drive.

The building then became a public house again, initially known as "Shenanigans" and then as "Whiskey Joes". It went on to become a job centre in 1993, and then was converted back to a public house again as "The Guildhall & Linen Exchange", under the management of Wetherspoons, in July 2012.

== See also ==
- List of Category A listed buildings in Fife
- List of listed buildings in Dunfermline, Fife
