= List of listed buildings in Hawick, Scottish Borders =

This is a list of listed buildings in the parish of Hawick in the Scottish Borders, Scotland.

== List ==
Name	Location	Date Listed	Grid Ref. (Note: Sometimes known as OSGB36, the grid reference (where provided) is based on the British national grid reference system used by the Ordnance Survey. • "Guide to National Grid". Ordnance Survey. • "Get-a-map". Ordnance Survey.)	Geo-coordinates	Notes	LB Number (Note: Historic Environment Scotland assign a unique alphanumeric identifier to each designated site in Scotland, for listed buildings this always begins with "LB", for example "LB12345".)	Image
1, 3 And 5 Howegate				55°25′16″N 2°47′21″W	Category C(S)	34647	Upload Photo
Drumlanrig Square, Brown Memorial Fountain And Clock				55°25′12″N 2°47′25″W	Category B	34648	Upload Photo
2, 4 And 6 Old Manse Lane, Slitrig Hall				55°25′14″N 2°47′16″W	Category C(S)	34655	Upload Photo
Slitrig Crescent, The Old Rectory And Riversdale, Including Gatepiers And Boundary Walls				55°25′07″N 2°47′23″W	Category C(S)	34665	Upload Photo
St Mary's Place, St Mary's And Old Parish Church (Church Of Scotland), With Churchyard, Boundary Walls And Gates				55°25′14″N 2°47′19″W	Category B	34612	Upload another image
Tower Knowe, Drumlanrig's Tower, Including Boundary Walls And Railings To S				55°25′17″N 2°47′17″W	Category B	34624	Upload Photo
4 And 6 High Street				55°25′18″N 2°47′16″W	Category C(S)	34627	Upload Photo
20 And 22 High Street, Crown Business Centre				55°25′19″N 2°47′13″W	Category C(S)	34630	Upload another image
11 High Street, Lloyds Tsb				55°25′19″N 2°47′17″W	Category B	34639	Upload another image
17 High Street				55°25′19″N 2°47′17″W	Category C(S)	34640	Upload another image
23 High Street				55°25′20″N 2°47′15″W	Category C(S)	34641	Upload another image
Fenwick				55°23′56″N 2°50′04″W	Category B	8380	Upload Photo
Crowbyres Bridge				55°24′45″N 2°47′00″W	Category C(S)	8398	Upload Photo
6 Howegate				55°25′16″N 2°47′22″W	Category C(S)	46411	Upload Photo
45 And 47 North Bridge Street				55°25′38″N 2°47′04″W	Category B	48108	Upload Photo
16-20 (Even Numbers) Commercial Road, Turnbull And Scott (Engineers) Ltd, Administration Block And Sheds				55°25′28″N 2°47′20″W	Category C(S)	50816	Upload Photo
7-11 (Odd Numbers) Buccleuch Street, Peter Scott's Factory				55°25′16″N 2°47′26″W	Category C(S)	51195	Upload Photo
22 Buccleuch Street				55°25′17″N 2°47′30″W	Category C(S)	51196	Upload Photo
Elm Grove And Orchard Terrace, 1-7 (Inclusive Numbers) Elm Court				55°25′17″N 2°46′51″W	Category C(S)	51199	Upload Photo
32 High Street, 2 And 4/1 And 4/2 Cross Wynd, Including The Queens Head Pub				55°25′21″N 2°47′13″W	Category B	51214	Upload another image
17 North Bridge Street, Elm House Hotel				55°25′32″N 2°47′03″W	Category C(S)	51220	Upload Photo
3 Oliver Place				55°25′28″N 2°47′07″W	Category B	51222	Upload Photo
4 Oliver Place				55°25′28″N 2°47′06″W	Category C(S)	51223	Upload Photo
Rosalee Brae, Little Salt Hall				55°25′35″N 2°47′30″W	Category C(S)	51228	Upload Photo
17, 18 And 19 Slitrig Crescent				55°25′07″N 2°47′19″W	Category C(S)	51230	Upload Photo
Sunnyhill Road, Woodnorton				55°25′29″N 2°48′11″W	Category B	51234	Upload Photo
Wilton Park, Gate Lodge, Gatepiers And Structures Including War Memorial, Boer War Memorial, Henderson Shelter, The Fountain And Macnee Fountain				55°25′09″N 2°48′19″W	Category C(S)	51244	Upload Photo
81, 83 And 85 High Street				55°25′27″N 2°47′07″W	Category C(S)	34644	Upload Photo
1 Slitrig Bank, Slitrig Bank House Including Boundary Walls				55°25′12″N 2°47′18″W	Category C(S)	34653	Upload Photo
3, 4 And 5 Slitrig Crescent				55°25′12″N 2°47′13″W	Category C(S)	34657	Upload Photo
Slitrig Crescent, St Cuthbert's Episcopal Church, Including Graveyard Walls And Gatepiers				55°25′08″N 2°47′20″W	Category B	34664	Upload Photo
1, 3 And 5 Buccleuch Street				55°25′17″N 2°47′24″W	Category C(S)	34670	Upload Photo
14 Buccleuch Street				55°25′17″N 2°47′28″W	Category C(S)	34673	Upload Photo
North Bridge Over River Teviot				55°25′40″N 2°47′06″W	Category C(S)	34684	Upload Photo
2 Tower Knowe And 2 Kirkstile				55°25′17″N 2°47′18″W	Category C(S)	34620	Upload Photo
7 Tower Knowe				55°25′18″N 2°47′19″W	Category C(S)	34622	Upload Photo
4 Tower Knowe				55°25′17″N 2°47′19″W	Category B	34625	Upload Photo
14 High Street				55°25′19″N 2°47′14″W	Category C(S)	34629	Upload another image
Hornshole Bridge				55°26′34″N 2°44′23″W	Category C(S)	8373	Upload Photo
Midshiels				55°26′52″N 2°44′09″W	Category B	8375	Upload Photo
Buccleuch Road, Ingleside, Including Ancillary Structures And Boundary Walls				55°25′10″N 2°48′05″W	Category C(S)	51193	Upload Photo
North Bridge Street, Hawick Library, Including 1 And 2 Laidlaw Terrace				55°25′39″N 2°47′06″W	Category B	51218	Upload another image
Weensland Road, Mansfield House Hotel, Including Gatepiers				55°25′53″N 2°45′47″W	Category C(S)	51240	Upload another image
West Stewart Place, Former Kirklands Hotel				55°25′52″N 2°47′14″W	Category C(S)	51243	Upload Photo
63, 65 And 67 High Street, Former Hawick Co-Operative Store				55°25′26″N 2°47′10″W	Category B	34643	Upload another image
1 The Village, Slitrig Cottage, Including Boundary Wall				55°25′11″N 2°47′19″W	Category C(S)	34651	Upload Photo
Kirkwynd Bridge Over Slitrig Water				55°25′11″N 2°47′17″W	Category C(S)	34656	Upload Photo
16, 18 And 20 Buccleuch Street				55°25′17″N 2°47′29″W	Category C(S)	34674	Upload Photo
Buccleuch Street, Hawick Old Parish Church Hall				55°25′15″N 2°47′36″W	Category C(S)	34677	Upload Photo
Dickson Street, Wilton Parish Church (Church Of Scotland)				55°25′44″N 2°47′18″W	Category B	34678	Upload another image
Buccleuch Road, Hawick Cottage Hospital Including Former X-Ray Block				55°25′14″N 2°47′49″W	Category B	34694	Upload Photo
1 St Mary's Place And 31 Drumlanrig Square				55°25′13″N 2°47′22″W	Category C(S)	34616	Upload Photo
3 Tower Knowe				55°25′17″N 2°47′18″W	Category C(S)	34621	Upload Photo
7 High Street, Bank Of Scotland				55°25′19″N 2°47′18″W	Category B	34637	Upload another image
Goldielands Tower				55°24′27″N 2°49′33″W	Category B	8379	Upload Photo
43 And 43A North Bridge Street				55°25′38″N 2°47′04″W	Category B	48106	Upload Photo
77 And 79 High Street				55°25′27″N 2°47′08″W	Category C(S)	51210	Upload Photo
2 Buccleuch Street				55°25′17″N 2°47′24″W	Category C(S)	34671	Upload Photo
Wilton Park, Hawick Museum (Formerly Wilton Lodge) Including Toilet Block And Boundary Wall				55°25′21″N 2°48′09″W	Category B	34688	Upload Photo
30 High Street				55°25′21″N 2°47′12″W	Category C(S)	34633	Upload another image
Branxholme Castle				55°23′46″N 2°50′50″W	Category A	13686	Upload another image
Burnhead Tower				55°26′31″N 2°46′05″W	Category B	8376	Upload Photo
4 Howegate				55°25′16″N 2°47′22″W	Category C(S)	46410	Upload Photo
1 Dovemount Place, The Station Hotel				55°25′42″N 2°47′07″W	Category C(S)	51198	Upload Photo
23 Havelock Street				55°25′48″N 2°47′16″W	Category B	51201	Upload Photo
27 And 29 High Street				55°25′21″N 2°47′14″W	Category C(S)	51208	Upload Photo
8 High Street				55°25′18″N 2°47′16″W	Category C(S)	51211	Upload Photo
10 Liddesdale Road, Lynnwood Lodge				55°24′56″N 2°47′30″W	Category C(S)	51215	Upload Photo
1 North Bridge Street				55°25′29″N 2°47′04″W	Category B	51219	Upload another image
2, 4 And 6 North Bridge Street And 2 Croft Road, Including Stone Gatepiers				55°25′32″N 2°47′05″W	Category C(S)	51221	Upload Photo
Roadhead, Norwood				55°25′32″N 2°47′53″W	Category B	51226	Upload Photo
Rosalee Brae, Ladylaw				55°25′34″N 2°47′34″W	Category B	51227	Upload Photo
Sunnyhill Road, East Langlands Lodge, Including Gatepier And Boundary Wall				55°25′27″N 2°48′00″W	Category C(S)	51231	Upload Photo
31, 33 And 35 High Street, Royal Bank Of Scotland				55°25′22″N 2°47′14″W	Category C(S)	34642	Upload another image
High Street, The Horse				55°25′28″N 2°47′05″W	Category A	34645	Upload another image
Mill Path, Corn Mill				55°25′14″N 2°47′10″W	Category B	34660	Upload Photo
10 And 12 Buccleuch Street				55°25′17″N 2°47′26″W	Category C(S)	34672	Upload Photo
Albert Bridge Over River Teviot				55°25′20″N 2°47′25″W	Category B	34675	Upload another image
31 And 32 Commercial Road, Former Wilton Mills				55°25′38″N 2°47′12″W	Category B	34680	Upload Photo
1 And 3 High Street				55°25′18″N 2°47′18″W	Category C(S)	34635	Upload another image
41 North Bridge Street				55°25′37″N 2°47′03″W	Category C(S)	48105	Upload Photo
Dickson Street, Wilton Parish Church Hall				55°25′45″N 2°47′19″W	Category B	51197	Upload Photo
Havelock Street, Silverbuthall Gatepiers				55°25′48″N 2°47′15″W	Category C(S)	51200	Upload Photo
19 High Street				55°25′20″N 2°47′15″W	Category C(S)	51203	Upload another image
25 High Street				55°25′21″N 2°47′15″W	Category C(S)	51207	Upload another image
47 High Street				55°25′23″N 2°47′12″W	Category C(S)	51209	Upload another image
10 High Street				55°25′18″N 2°47′16″W	Category C(S)	51212	Upload Photo
9 Lockhart Place, Newbiggin				55°25′21″N 2°46′52″W	Category C(S)	51216	Upload Photo
36 Princes Street, Wilton Centre (Former Wilton Parish School) Including Boundary Walls And Gatepiers				55°25′44″N 2°47′15″W	Category C(S)	51225	Upload Photo
1 Silver Street And 9 Kirkstile, Including The Exchange Bar				55°25′15″N 2°47′19″W	Category C(S)	51229	Upload another image
Sunnyhill Road, East And West Langlands, Including Garden Pavilion, Boundary Wall And Gatepier				55°25′29″N 2°48′00″W	Category C(S)	51232	Upload Photo
1, 2, 3 And 4 Tower Dykeside (Former Tower Hotel)				55°25′17″N 2°47′14″W	Category B	51235	Upload Photo
5 And 6 Tower Knowe				55°25′17″N 2°47′20″W	Category C(S)	51239	Upload Photo
2 Howegate				55°25′17″N 2°47′22″W	Category C(S)	34646	Upload Photo
Slitrig Crescent, Mill House, And 3 Mill Path, Including Boundary Wall				55°25′14″N 2°47′12″W	Category C(S)	34661	Upload Photo
2 And 3 Sandbed				55°25′17″N 2°47′22″W	Category C(S)	34667	Upload Photo
Sandbed, Bridge House, Including Wall And Railings				55°25′19″N 2°47′23″W	Category C(S)	34669	Upload another image
Weensland Road, Weensland Mill Unit 13 (Former Weensland Mill Offices And Store)				55°25′48″N 2°46′06″W	Category C(S)	34685	Upload another image
Sandbed, Orrock Halls, Including Boundary Walls				55°25′19″N 2°47′25″W	Category C(S)	34689	Upload Photo
12 High Street				55°25′19″N 2°47′15″W	Category B	34628	Upload another image
34-44 High Street (Even Numbers), Hawick Town Hall				55°25′21″N 2°47′10″W	Category A	34634	Upload another image
19 Howegate				55°25′14″N 2°47′22″W	Category C(S)	46423	Upload Photo
Bourtree Place, Hawick Congregational Community Church And Halls				55°25′32″N 2°46′59″W	Category C(S)	51189	Upload Photo
2 And 4 Bourtree Place, Eastbank House				55°25′28″N 2°47′04″W	Category C(S)	51190	Upload Photo
Brougham Place, Trinity Church, Including Session House, Vestry And Halls				55°25′27″N 2°47′02″W	Category C(S)	51192	Upload Photo
Buccleuch Road, Parkview, Including Boundary Wall, Gate, Steps And Lamp Post				55°25′06″N 2°48′10″W	Category C(S)	51194	Upload Photo
16 And 18 High Street				55°25′19″N 2°47′14″W	Category B	51213	Upload another image
6 And 7 Mansfield Square, Former Wilton Parish Manse				55°25′47″N 2°46′50″W	Category C(S)	51217	Upload another image See more images
Sunnyhill Road, Westwood, Including Outbuilding, Boundary Walls, Gates And Steps				55°25′28″N 2°48′06″W	Category B	51233	Upload Photo
West Stewart Place, Ardenlea				55°25′54″N 2°47′11″W	Category C(S)	51242	Upload Photo
7 Slitrig Crescent				55°25′11″N 2°47′14″W	Category C(S)	34658	Upload Photo
St George's Lane, Teviot And Roberton Church (Church Of Scotland) And Church Halls (Formerly St George's West Church)				55°25′18″N 2°47′30″W	Category C(S)	34676	Upload Photo
Kirkstile, Former Tower Mill				55°25′16″N 2°47′18″W	Category A	34619	Upload another image
2 High Street				55°25′18″N 2°47′16″W	Category C(S)	34626	Upload Photo
9 High Street				55°25′19″N 2°47′17″W	Category C(S)	34638	Upload another image
Tentyfoot Tower				55°23′46″N 2°50′50″W	Category A	8397	Upload Photo
12 Howegate				55°25′15″N 2°47′22″W	Category C(S)	46414	Upload Photo
7 Howegate				55°25′16″N 2°47′21″W	Category C(S)	46419	Upload Photo
11 Howegate				55°25′15″N 2°47′21″W	Category C(S)	46421	Upload Photo
49 North Bridge Street				55°25′38″N 2°47′04″W	Category B	48109	Upload Photo
Mansefield Road, Eastfield Mills				55°25′45″N 2°46′46″W	Category B	50813	Upload another image See more images
24 Commercial Road, Shorts Of Hawick				55°25′30″N 2°47′19″W	Category C(S)	50815	Upload another image
21 High Street				55°25′20″N 2°47′15″W	Category C(S)	51204	Upload Photo
Rear Of 21 High Street, Former William Beck's Stocking Shop				55°25′20″N 2°47′17″W	Category C(S)	51206	Upload Photo
152 Weensland Road, Heronhill Lodge, Including Gatepier				55°25′46″N 2°46′07″W	Category C(S)	51241	Upload another image See more images
Loan, Former Drumlanrig Hospital				55°25′09″N 2°47′25″W	Category B	34663	Upload Photo
1 Sandbed				55°25′17″N 2°47′22″W	Category C(S)	34666	Upload Photo
10 Howegate				55°25′15″N 2°47′22″W	Category C(S)	46413	Upload Photo
Victoria Road, Former Office To Turnbulls Finishing Works				55°25′26″N 2°47′36″W	Category C(S)	50814	Upload Photo
22 Bourtree Place, Hawick Conservative Club				55°25′31″N 2°47′01″W	Category B	51191	Upload another image
12 And 13 Oliver Place And 1 Croft Road				55°25′31″N 2°47′05″W	Category C(S)	51224	Upload Photo

== Key ==
The scheme for classifying buildings in Scotland is:

- Category A: "buildings of national or international importance, either architectural or historic; or fine, little-altered examples of some particular period, style or building type."
- Category B: "buildings of regional or more than local importance; or major examples of some particular period, style or building type, which may have been altered."
- Category C: "buildings of local importance; lesser examples of any period, style, or building type, as originally constructed or moderately altered; and simple traditional buildings which group well with other listed buildings."

In March 2016 there were 47,288 listed buildings in Scotland. Of these, 8% were Category A, and 50% were Category B, with the remaining 42% being Category C.
