= James Campbell Walker =

Scottish architect (1821–1888)

James Campbell Walker (11 April 1821 – 10 January 1888) was a Scottish architect in the 19th century, practising across the country and specialising in poorhouses and schools. His main claim to fame is in having designed Dunfermline Carnegie Library, the world's first Carnegie library, in Andrew Carnegie's home town of Dunfermline.

== Life ==
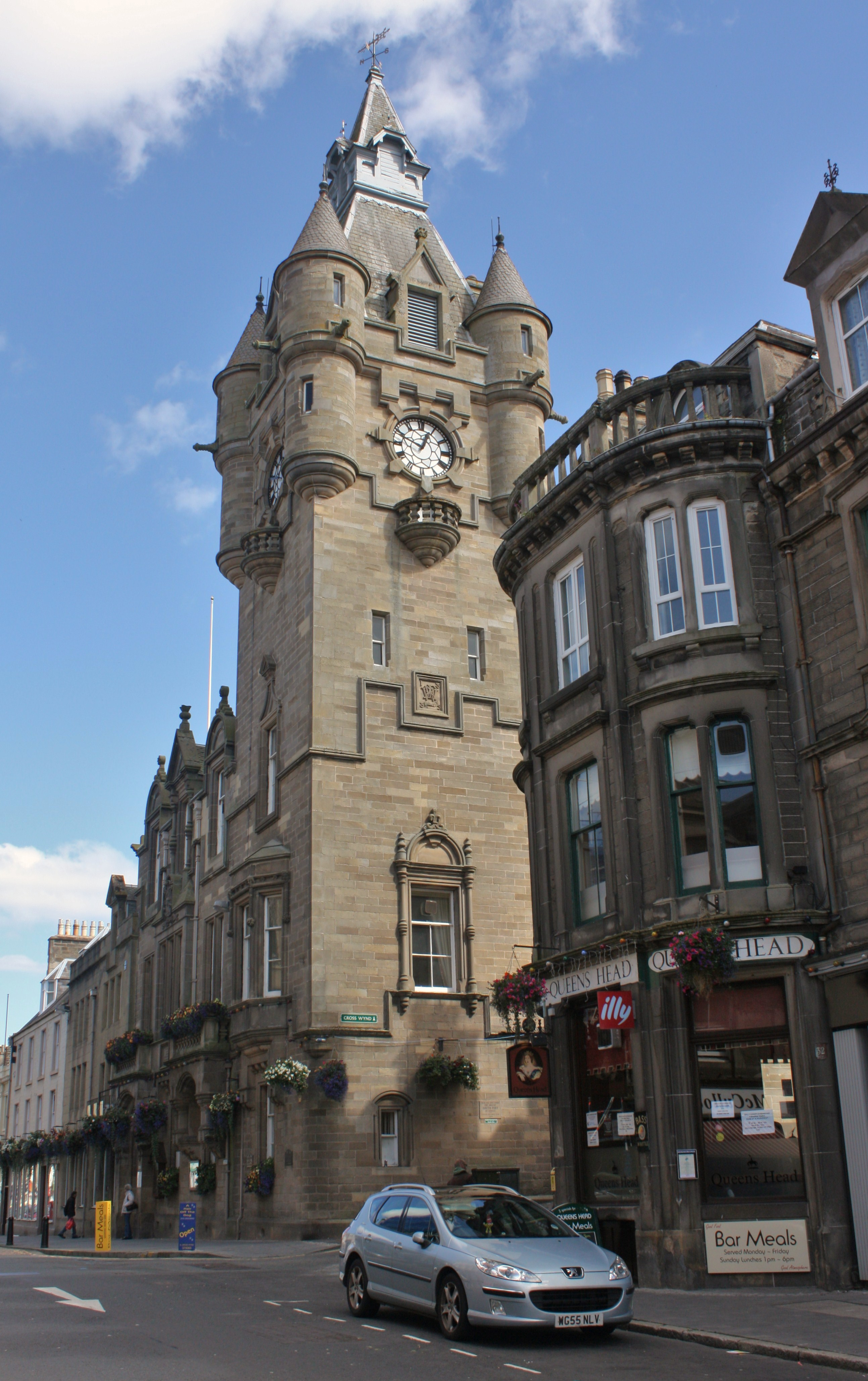
Hawick Town Hall, on High Street by James Campbell Walker

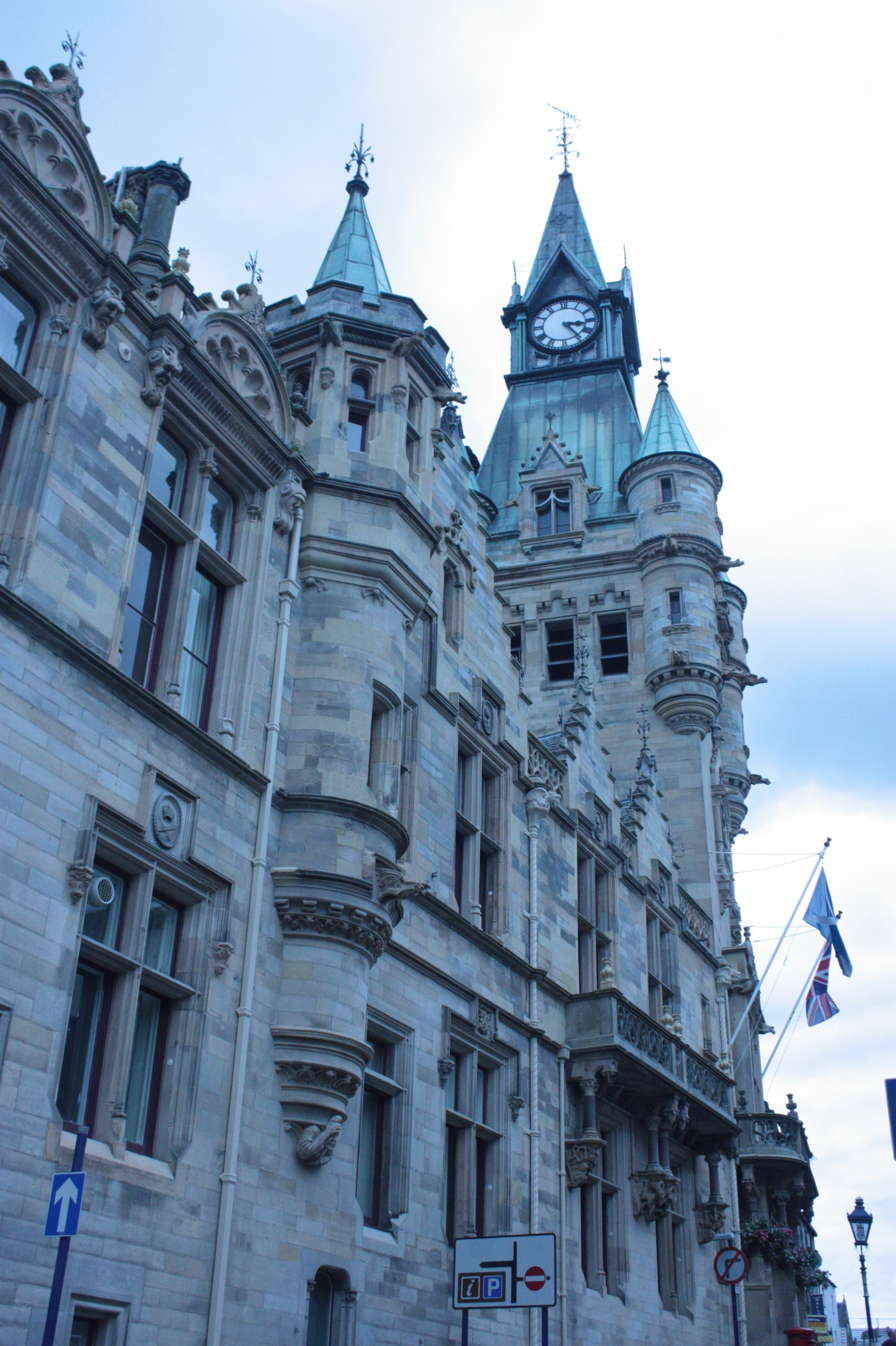
Dunfermline City Chambers, detail as seen from the south

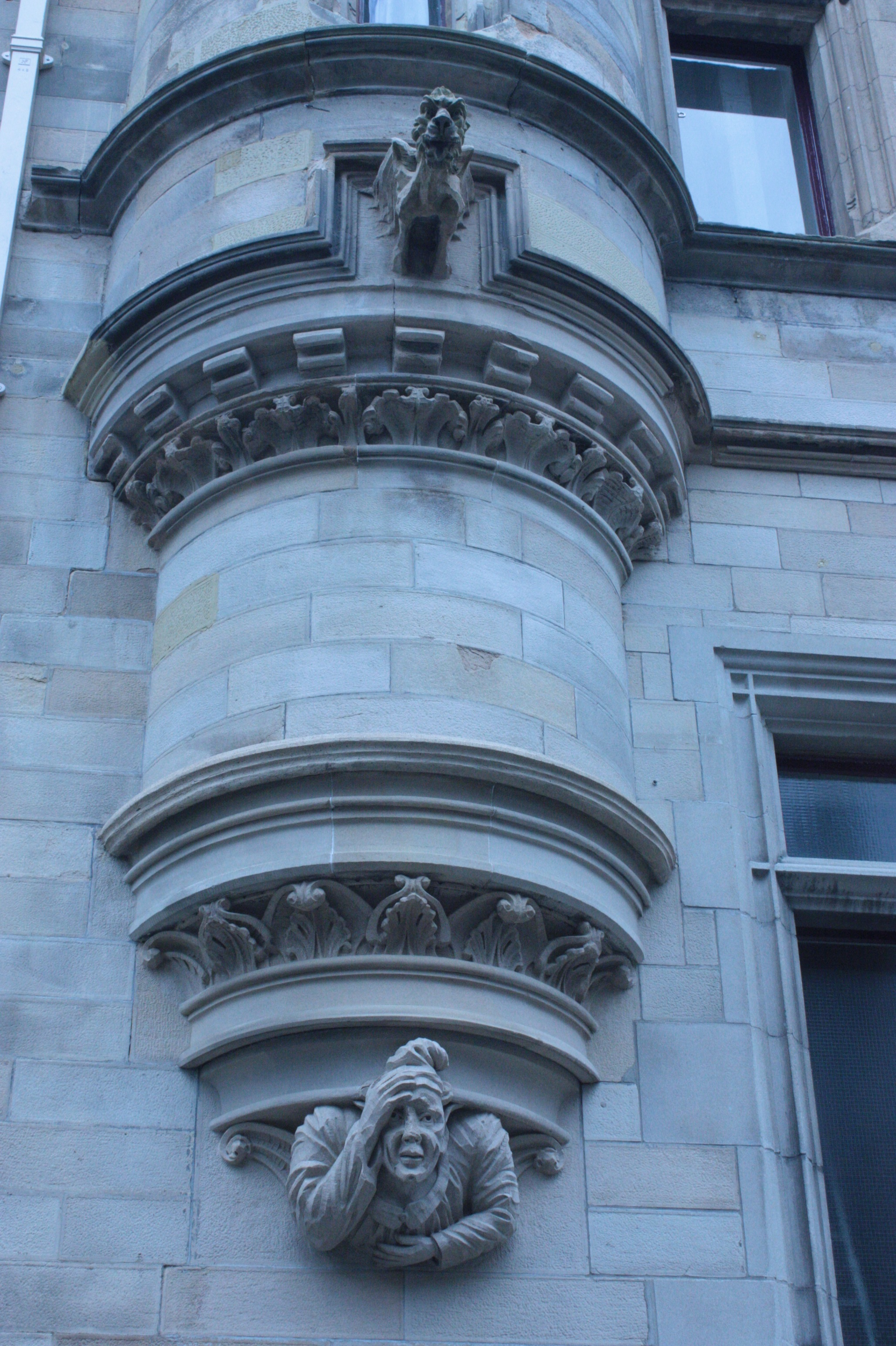
Dunfermline City Chambers (detail)

He was born in Strathmiglo to a family of bleachers, in Scotland known as "waulkers". He became the son of Thomas Walker and Barbara Campbell.

He trained in Edinburgh under the architect William Burn from January 1842. In the 1850s he transferred to work for Burn's friend David Bryce. His work shows the influence of each, but he never received the widespread fame of these two.

Due to family links he received many estate commissions for farms then began to specialise in poorhouses.

Very late in life, in 1875, he married his cousin, Agnes Walker from Eastbourne.

He died of chronic bronchitis in 1888 and is buried in Auchtermuchty in Fife.

== Principal works ==
- Galashiels Poorhouse (1859)
- Dysart Combination Poorhouse, Thornton, Fife (1860)
- Auchterarder Poorhouse (1862)
- Dumbarton Combination Poorhouse (1862)
- Stonehaven Sheriff Court and County Buildings (1863)
- Auchtermuchty Primary School (pre 1865)
- Glencorse School (pre 1865)
- Mrs Smeaton's School, St Andrews (pre 1865)
- Appin School (pre 1865)
- Rabbit Hall and two adjacent villas, Portobello, Edinburgh (1865)
- Islay Combination Poorhouse, Bowmore (1865)
- Pitlochry School (1865)
- Arngask School, Glenfarg, Perthshire (1863)
- Total rebuilding of Blair Drummond House and estate (1868–1872)
- Dunfermline City Chambers (1875)
- Dunfermline Carnegie Library, the world's first Carnegie library (1880)
- Ladybank Parish Church (1881)
- Hawick Town Hall (1883)
- Ancrum Police Station (1884)
- New ballroom at Blair Castle (1885)
