= Dunfermline (district) =

Former local government district in Scotland

Coordinates: 56.11°N 3.54°W

- District
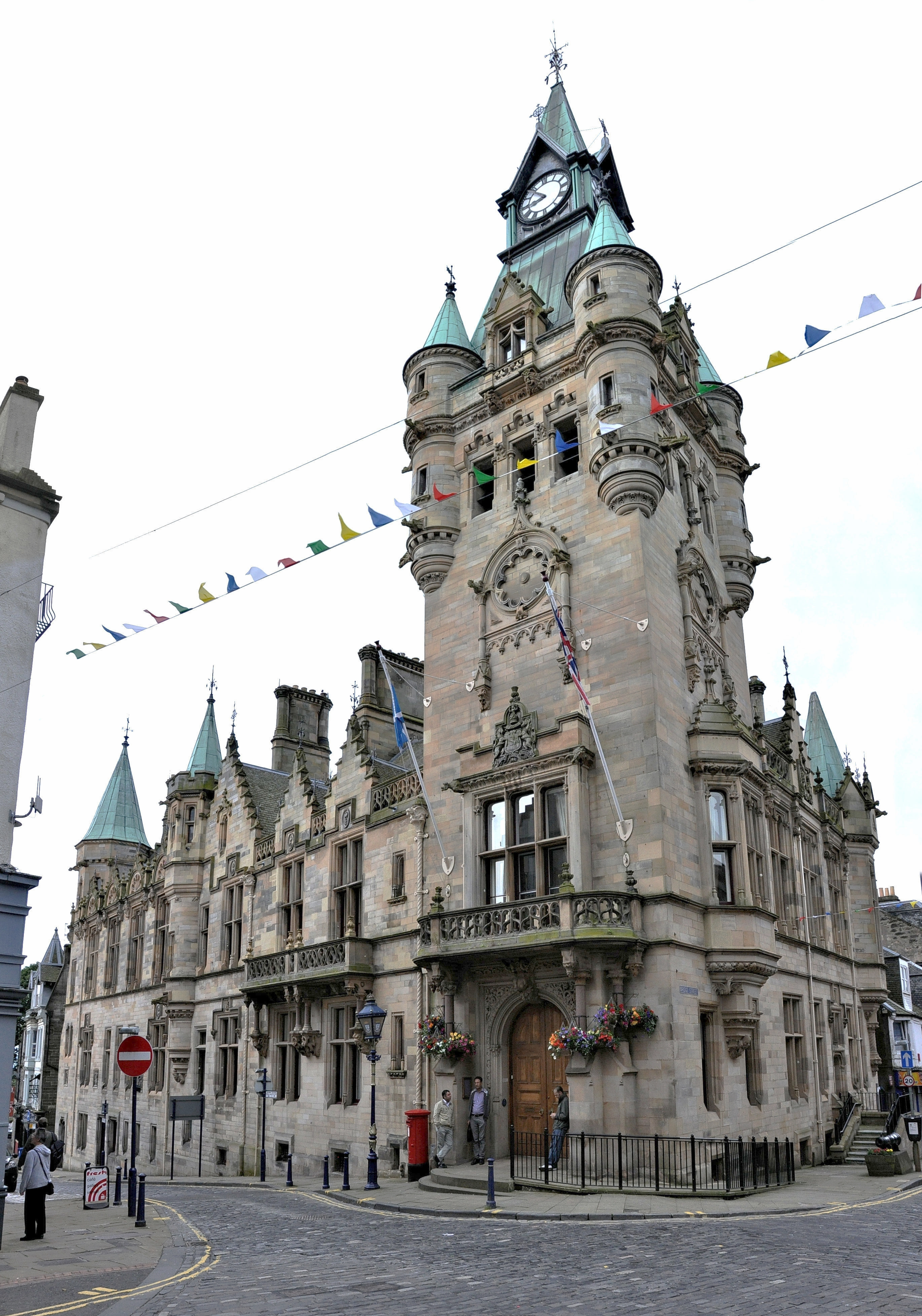
- Dunfermline City Chambers

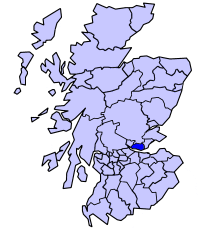
- Dunfermline district within Scotland
- Population
  - 1994: 129,830
- History
  - Created: 16 May 1975
  - Abolished: 31 March 1996
  - Succeeded by: (Part of) Fife
- Government: Dunfermline District Council
  - HQ: Dunfermline

Dunfermline (Scottish Gaelic: Dùn Phàrlain, Scots: Dunfaurlin) was a local government district in the Fife region of Scotland from 1975 to 1996, lying to the south-west of the regional capital Glenrothes.

== History ==
As its name suggests, the district was centred on Dunfermline, an important royal burgh in the historic county of Fife. The district was created in 1975 under the Local Government (Scotland) Act 1973, which established a two-tier structure of local government across mainland Scotland comprising upper-tier regions and lower-tier districts. Dunfermline was one of three districts created within the region of Fife along with Kirkcaldy and North-East Fife. The district covered the whole area of six former districts and part of two others from the historic county of Fife, which were all abolished at the same time:

- Cowdenbeath Burgh
- Culross Burgh
- Dunfermline Burgh
- Dunfermline District
- Inverkeithing Burgh
- Kirkcaldy District (Gray Park polling district only, rest went to new Kirkcaldy district)
- Lochgelly Burgh
- Lochgelly District (except the electoral divisions of Auchterderran, Denend, Kinglassie, and New Carden, which went to Kirkcaldy district)

Apart from the main built-up area of Dunfermline itself, the district therefore also included port towns on the Firth of Forth, other coastal villages and numerous inland settlements west of Dunfermline, plus further territory east of the M90 motorway including Kelty, the Benarty villages and the towns of Cowdenbeath and Lochgelly. The district's northern borders were with Clackmannan district in the Central region and Perth and Kinross district in the Tayside region.

The Local Government etc. (Scotland) Act 1994 abolished all of the districts and regions. Fife became a single unitary council area, headquartered in Glenrothes as the regional council had also been. Similar boundaries as those of Dunfermline district have since been re-used for some purposes such as local economic planning, tourism, and in the post-2005 Dunfermline and West Fife (UK Parliament constituency), although rarely including the settlements east of the M90.

== Political control ==
The first election to the district council was held in 1974, initially operating as a shadow authority alongside the outgoing authorities until it came into its powers on 16 May 1975. Throughout the council's existence the Labour Party held a majority of the seats.

| Party in control | Years |
|---|---|
| Labour | 1975–1996 |

== Premises ==
The council was based at Dunfermline City Chambers at 3 Bridge Street in Dunfermline, which had been completed in 1879 for the former Dunfermline Town Council.

== See also ==
- 1992 Dunfermline District Council election
- Subdivisions of Scotland
