= Hawick Town Hall =

Municipal building in Hawick, Scotland

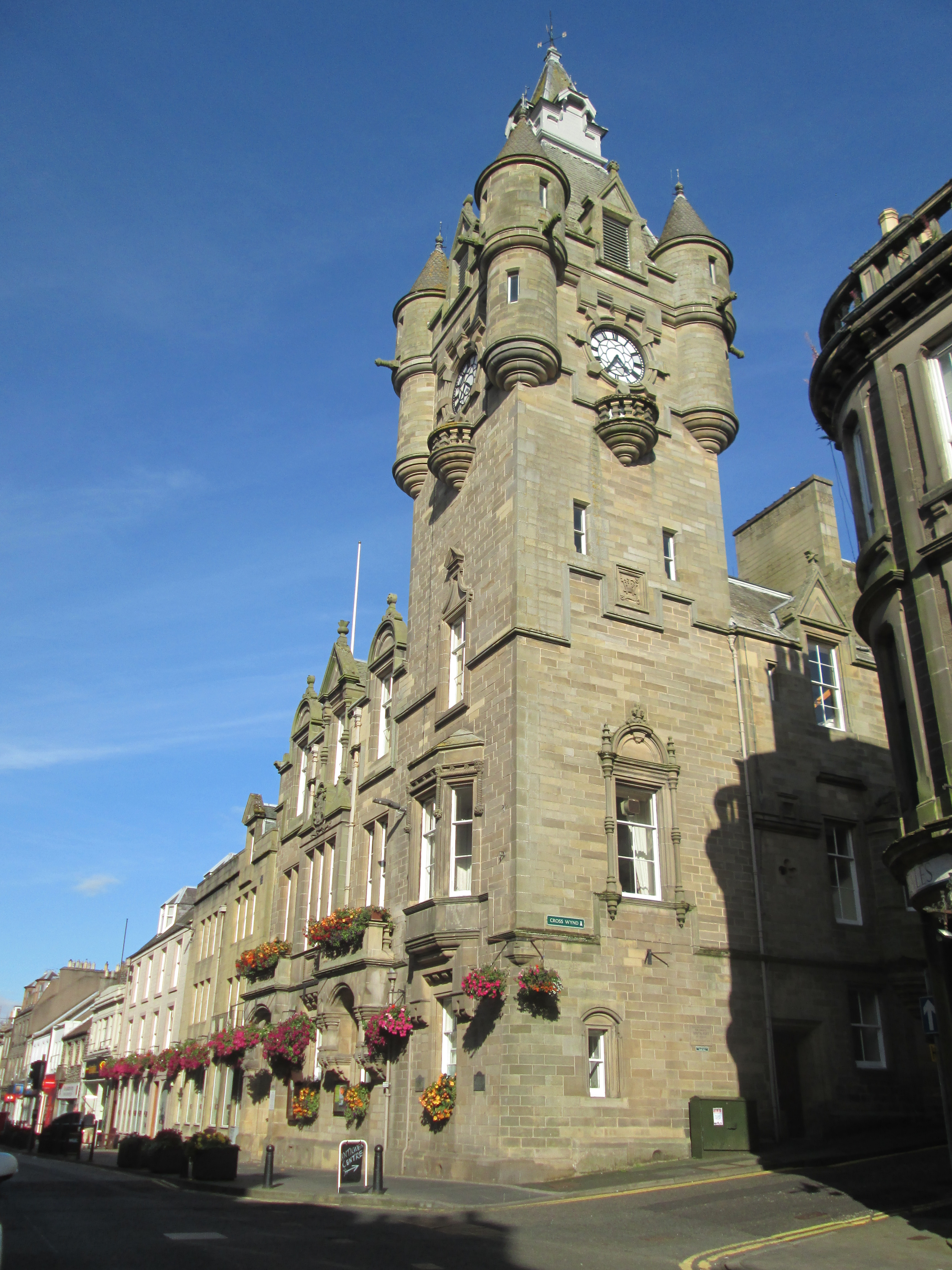
- Hawick Town Hall

- Shown in the Scottish Borders
- 55.4226°N 2.7865°W
- Location: High Street, Hawick

History
- Built: 1886

Site notes
- Architect: James Campbell Walker
- Architectural style: Scottish baronial style

Listed Building – Category A
- Official name: 34-44 High Street (Even numbers), Hawick Town Hall
- Designated: 16 March 1971
- Reference no.: LB34634

Hawick Town Hall is a municipal building in the High Street, Hawick, Scotland. The structure, which served as the meeting place of Hawick Burgh Council, is a Category A listed building.

== History ==
The first building on the site was a medieval structure with a thatched roof which was acquired by the burgh for use as a tolbooth in 1657 and then rebuilt in 1694: it included a courthouse and a lock-up for petty criminals. The tolbooth was replaced by a purpose-built facility known as the town house in 1781: it was arcaded on the south side so that markets could be held, with an external staircase to reach the assembly room on the first floor, and it featured a tall clock tower with a spire. In the early 1880s the burgh leaders decided to demolish the town house and to replace it with a more substantial town hall.

The memorial stone for the new building was laid by Duchess of Buccleuch. It was designed by James Campbell Walker in the Scottish baronial style, built by John and William Marshall in ashlar stone at a cost of £16,000 and was completed in 1886. The design involved an asymmetrical main frontage with four bays facing onto the High Street; the first bay on the left featured an arched doorway with a rounded architrave. On the first floor there were stone balconies with two-light sash windows in the first and third bays, a slightly projecting three-light window with a coat of arms above in the second bay, and an oriel window in the fourth bay. The bays on the second floor were fenestrated with sash windows, the first three of which were pedimented, and there was a prominent four-face clock tower with bartizans and a pyramid-shaped roof in the south west corner. The building was later extended by six bays to the left in a plainer style to create extra accommodation for council officers and their departments. The local police station, which formed part of the building, was accessed through an archway on the south side. Internally, the principal rooms were the main hall, the council chamber and the courtroom.

The building became a venue for local political and civic events: visitors in the early 20th century included the novelist, Arthur Conan Doyle, who gave a speech on the "Exposition of Unionist Principles" in January 1906. Increased capacity for public events was created with the addition of the function room known as the "lesser hall" in the around 1960. The police service also moved from the town hall to new facilities at Wilton Hill in 1964. However, the town hall continued to serve as the headquarters of Hawick Burgh Council for much of the 20th century and then became the offices of Roxburgh District Council after it was formed in 1975.

The basement, which had accommodated police cells, was renovated in the early 1980s, in a schedule of work that included the creation of an underground emergency control centre for use in the event of nuclear war. The building ceased to be the local seat of government when the new unitary authority, Scottish Borders Council, was established at Council Headquarters in Newtown St Boswells in 1996. However, it continued to serve as an events venue and also as a meeting place for the local area committee of the Scottish Borders Council. An extensive programme of refurbishment works, which included the installation of a new gold coloured clock inside the building, was completed in October 2012.

Works of art in the town hall include a portrait by George Fiddes Watt of the former provost, John Melrose.

== See also ==
- List of listed buildings in Hawick, Scottish Borders
- List of Category A listed buildings in the Scottish Borders
