= Dunfermline City Chambers =

Municipal Building in Dunfermline, Scotland

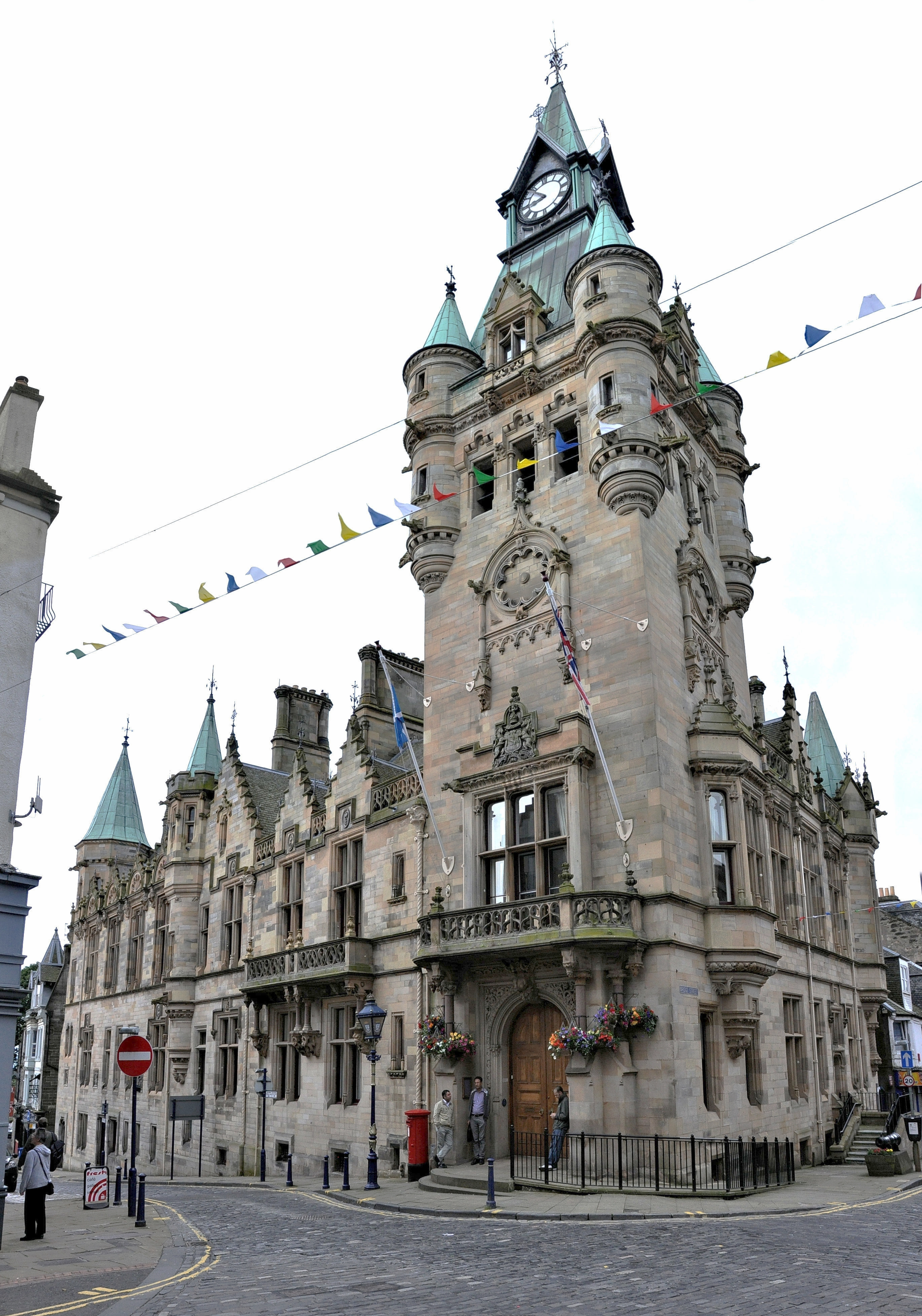
- Dunfermline City Chambers

- Shown in Fife
- 56.0708°N 3.4640°W
- Location: 3 Bridge Street, Dunfermline

History
- Built: 1879

Site notes
- Architect: James Campbell Walker
- Architectural style: French Gothic style

Listed Building – Category A
- Designated: 12 January 1971
- Reference no.: LB25973

Dunfermline City Chambers is a municipal facility at the corner of Bridge Street and Kirkgate in Dunfermline, Fife. The building, which serves as home to the local area committee of Fife Council, is a Category A listed building.

== History ==
The building was commissioned to replace the old town house in Bridge Street which had been completed in 1771. After rapid industrial growth in the local area, civic leaders decided they needed a more substantial facility and the old town house was demolished, to make way for the current building.

The foundation stone for the new building was laid on 11 October 1876. It was designed by James Campbell Walker in the French Gothic style, built by Messrs W & J Hutchison and completed in May 1879. The design involved an asymmetrical main frontage with twelve bays facing onto Kirkgate; the southern section featured a doorway with an octagonal turret above in the south east corner, while the northern section featured an elaborate doorway with a balcony and prominent four-face clock tower with bartizans in the north east corner. The structure included heraldic stones, recovered from the demolished 18th century town house, which may have originated from the now derelict Dunfermline Palace, a few hundred yards to the south. The stonework on the Bridge Street façade included busts of Malcolm Canmore, Queen Margaret, Robert the Bruce and Elizabeth de Burgh. Internally, the principal room was the council chamber on the first floor: it incorporated an oak hammerbeam roof. There were police cells in the basement of the building.

The building was the headquarters of the royal burgh of Dunfermline until it was replaced by Dunfermline District under the wider Fife Regional Council in May 1975. The building ceased to be a seat of government after the district council was abolished in 1996, under the Local Government etc. (Scotland) Act 1994. Since then, the building has served as the home of the local area committee of Fife Council, as a venue for marriages and civil partnerships and as the local registration office.

Works of art in the city chambers include Sir Joseph Paton's painting of Queen Margaret and Malcolm Canmore.

== See also ==
- List of Category A listed buildings in Fife
- List of listed buildings in Dunfermline, Fife
- Edinburgh City Chambers
- Glasgow City Chambers
