= Buffies Brae Viaduct =

Former railway viaduct in Scotland

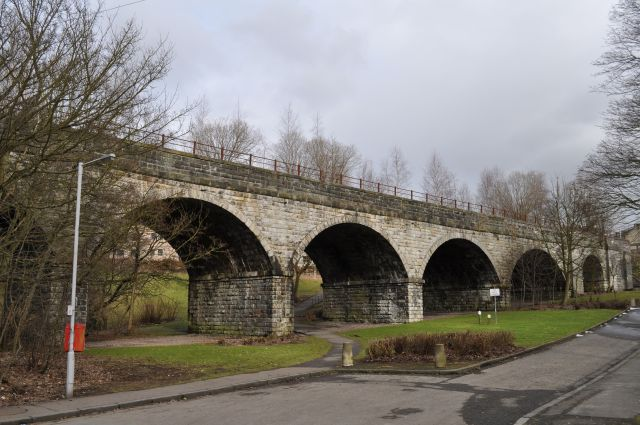
- Remains of the viaduct
- Coordinates: 56.07495°N 3.46711°W
- OS grid reference: NT 08877 87871
- Crosses: Tower Burn
- Locale: Fife
- Other names: Tower Burn Viaduct; Harrie Brae Viaduct

Characteristics
- Design: Arch
- No. of spans: 8

History
- Opened: 1849
- Closed: 1988

Listed Building – Category C(S)
- Official name: Former Viaduct to East of Buffies Brae at NT 0888 8786
- Designated: 10 March 2000
- Reference no.: LB46885

Location
- Interactive map of Buffies Brae Viaduct

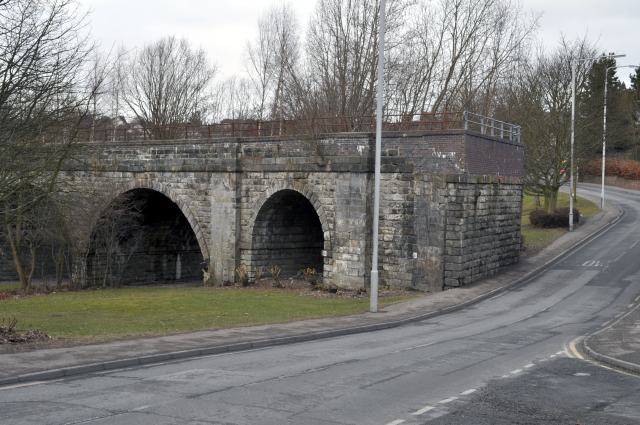
Bridge abruptly ends next to the road

The Buffies Brae Viaduct is a former viaduct in Dunfermline, Scotland that crosses the Tower Burn. The remains of the bridge has eight arches but the original viaduct may have had 9.

The bridge used to carry the Stirling and Dunfermline Railway. The bridge dates back to 1849 and was designated a category C listed building in 2000.

== See also ==
- List of bridges in Scotland
