= North Parish Church, Dunfermline =

North Parish Church
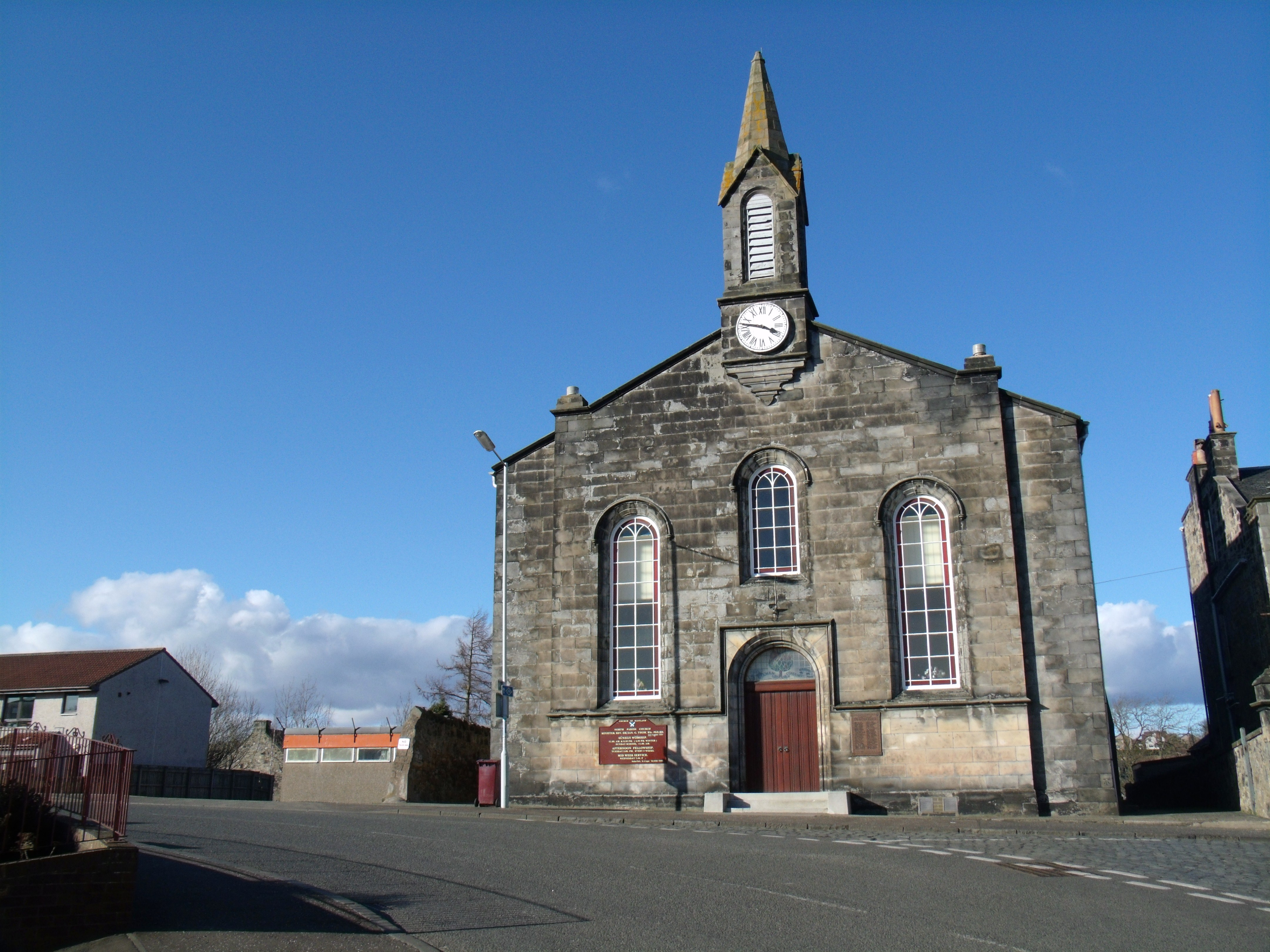
- Viewed from the south
- North Parish Church
- 56°4′30.857″N 3°28′7.900″W
- OS grid reference: NT 08668 87908
- Location: Dunfermline
- Country: Scotland
- Denomination: Church of Scotland

Architecture
- Heritage designation: Category C listed building
- Designated: 9 October 1998
- Style: Georgian
- Completed: 1840

North Parish Church is a Church of Scotland church, on Golfdrum Street in Dunfermline in Fife, Scotland. It was built in 1840, and it is a Category C listed building.

== History and description ==
The church was originally a chapel of ease, built in 1840 as part of the Church Extension Scheme of the Church of Scotland, and funded by the government. There was strong opposition to its construction by local dissenting people; it was reported that in January 1839, protesters broke down the door of a chapel where a meeting about the planned church was being held.

It is built of sandstone, with ashlar on the south side, which has a prominent octagonal stone spire and bellcote, and a clock below the bellcote. The south door, and the windows to either side and above, have round arches. The fanlight above the door has stained glass representing the burning bush, accompanied by a Latin text. There is a marble war memorial panel to the right of the door.

Inside, there is a porch, with stone steps on either side leading to the semi-octagonal gallery over the nave. The gallery is supported by fluted cast-iron columns.

A hall was built at the back of the church in 1886.

The clock, installed in 1858, was built by Alexander MacKenzie of Glasgow, a machinist. It has a double three-legged gravity escapement mechanism, thought to be based on the mechanism designed by Lord Grimthorpe, which was later used in Big Ben. The organ, by Walcker of Ludwigsburg, was donated by Andrew Carnegie in 1903.
